The following is a partial list of Philippine television programs by date of first broadcast in the Philippines. The list of TV series is in reverse chronological order by year; within each year, the list is chronological.

1960's
 The News with Uncle Bob (October 30, 1961 – September 22, 1972)
 Big News (March 19, 1962 – August 8, 2008)
 Pangunahing Balita (March 19, 1962 – October 30, 1998)
 Top 5 Update (March 19, 1962 – September 22, 1972)
 Hiwaga sa Bahay na Bato (September 30, 1963 – January 25, 1964)
 The World Tonight (November 21, 1966 – present)
 Balita Ngayon (February 20, 1967 – February 27, 1987)
 Super Laff-In (February 1, 1969 – August 28, 1999)
 Eyewitness Reports (July 14, 1969 – May 29, 1970)

1970's
 NewsWatch (June 1, 1970 – October 29, 2012)
 PBA on KBS (April 9, 1975 – December 18, 1977)
 Kapwa Ko Mahal Ko (December 1, 1975 – present)
 PBA on BBC (March 21, 1976 – December 21, 1976)
 GMA News Digest (November 1, 1976 – January 4, 1987)
 PBA on MBS (April 16, 1978 – November 28, 1981)
 GMA Supershow (May 7, 1978 – January 26, 1997)
 Eat Bulaga! (July 30, 1979 – present)

1980's
 Anna Liza (February 4, 1980 – May 10, 1985)
 Lovingly Yours, Helen (September 7, 1980 – September 1, 1996)
 Ating Alamin (October 5, 1980 – July 10, 2016)
 Nang Dahil sa Pag-Ibig (September 7, 1981 – January 1, 1982)
 PBA on Vintage Sports (March 7, 1982 – December 12, 1999)
 RPN NewsBreak (April 5, 1982 – March 21, 2003)
 The Penthouse Live! (August 29, 1982 – February 15, 1987)
 The 11:30 Report (November 1, 1982 – May 16, 1996)
 Ang Iglesia ni Cristo (February 13, 1983 – present)
 Yagit (April 25, 1983 – August 2, 1985)
 Coney Reyes on Camera (May 19, 1984 – December 26, 1998)
 Heredero (July 23, 1984 – September 4, 1987)
 Amorsola (August 5, 1985 – February 27, 1987)
 That's Entertainment (January 6, 1986 – May 3, 1996)
 Mirasol del Cielo (January 6, 1986 – February 27, 1987)
 Goin' Bananas (February 3, 1986 – May 10, 1991)
 Heartbeat (April 16, 1986 – December 16, 1987)
 GMA Balita (May 19, 1986 – April 8, 1998)
 GMA Headline News (May 19, 1986 – January 3, 1992)
 GMA Saturday/Sunday Report (May 24, 1986 – August 20, 1989)
 Lunch Date (June 9, 1986 – March 19, 1993)
 Balita sa IBC (July 14, 1986 – November 24, 1989)
 Balita sa IBC Huling Ulat (July 14, 1986 – November 24, 1989)
 Vilma (August 8, 1986 – September 29, 1995)
 Andrea Amor (September 13, 1986 – April 11, 1987)
 The Sharon Cuneta Show (September 14, 1986 – June 15, 1997)
 Magandang Umaga Po (September 15, 1986 – May 31, 1996)
 ABS-CBN News Advisory (September 15, 1986 – September 4, 2005)
 Nestle Special (September 15, 1986 – April 15, 1987)
 Luneta: Discovery Hour (September 15, 1986 – November 21, 1986)
 Hilakbot (September 15, 1986 – November 21, 1986)
 Ina (September 15, 1986 – December 12, 1986)
 Mommy Ko, Daddy Ko! (September 18, 1986 – September 10, 1987)
 Napakasakit, Kuya Eddie (September 18, 1986 – April 28, 1988)
 Nine-Teeners (September 19, 1986 – September 11, 1987)
 PEP (People, Events and Places) Talk (September 21, 1986 – July 3, 1990)
 Sic O'Clock News (January 4, 1987 – September 15, 1990)
 GMA News Live (January 5, 1987 – July 14, 2002)
 Movie Magazine (February 28, 1987 – September 23, 1995)
 TV Patrol (March 2, 1987 – present)
 Palibhasa Lalake (March 3, 1987 – November 10, 1998)
 Probe (March 6, 1987 – June 30, 2010)
 Family Rosary Crusade (March 7, 1987 – November 18, 2018)
 Martin and Pops Twogether (March 7, 1987 – April 30, 1988)
 Dance-2-Nite (March 7, 1987 – February 27, 1988)
 Afternoon Delight (April 20, 1987 – February 17, 1989)
 Mother Studio Presents (April 24, 1987 – August 2, 1996)
 Agila (September 7, 1987 – February 7, 1992)
 News on 4 (October 26, 1987 – September 29, 1995)
 Maricel Regal Drama Special (November 17, 1987 – March 20, 1989)
 Okay Ka, Fairy Ko! (November 26, 1987 – April 3, 1997)
 Eye to Eye (January 11, 1988 – August 9, 1996)
 Dance Tonight (March 5, 1988 – December 24, 1988)
 Ipaglaban Mo! (July 11, 1988 – present)
 Martin After Dark (July 30, 1988 – November 28, 1998)
 Magandang Gabi... Bayan (August 21, 1988 – December 31, 2005)
 PTV Newsbreak (March 13, 1989 – March 13, 2020)
 The Maricel Drama Special (March 27, 1989 – May 12, 1997)
 Mel & Jay (August 20, 1989 – March 31, 1996)
 The Hour Updates (October 9, 1989 – September 30, 1994)
 Anna Luna (November 27, 1989 – September 29, 1995)
 Bantay Balita (November 27, 1989 – September 28, 1990)
 Headline Trese (November 27, 1989 – July 10, 1998)
 Sa Linggo nAPO Sila (December 3, 1989 – January 29, 1995)

1990's
 Junior Patrol (May 21, 1990 – July 26, 1992)
 The Inside Story (July 10, 1990 – November 3, 1998)
 Business Today (October 1, 1990 – March 29, 1996)
 Teysi ng Tahanan (January 14, 1991 – February 21, 1997)
 Abangan Ang Susunod Na Kabanata (February 4, 1991 – June 20, 1997)
 Kape at Balita (February 11, 1991 – August 16, 2013)
 Islands Newsbreak (May 2, 1991 – March 6, 1992)
 Maalaala Mo Kaya (May 15, 1991 – December 10, 2022)
 GMA Network News (January 6, 1992 – July 14, 2002)
 Valiente (February 10, 1992 – September 12, 1997)
 Firing Line (February 17, 1992 – January 11, 1999)
 Balitang Balita (February 21, 1992 – April 7, 2004)
 Live on 5 (February 21, 1992 – April 11, 2004)
 Entertainment Today (February 21, 1992 – December 27, 1999)
 The Big Night (February 23, 1992 – February 16, 2004)
 ABCinema (February 25, 1992 – August 8, 2008)
 IBC NewsBreak (March 9, 1992 – February 9, 2018)
 IBC News 11 O'Clock Report (March 9, 1992 – July 7, 1995)
 IBC News 5:30 Report (March 9, 1992 – July 7, 1995)
 GMA's Best (April 27, 1992 – November 25, 2002)
 Hoy Gising! (May 4, 1992 – March 5, 2001)
 5 and Up (May 16, 1992 – July 14, 2002)
 Battle of the Brains (July 18, 1992 – July 14, 2001)
 Showbiz Lingo (August 2, 1992 – June 6, 1999)
 Mara Clara (August 17, 1992 – February 14, 1997)
 Ober Da Bakod (September 14, 1992 – May 27, 1997)
 Gwapings Live! (October 4, 1992 – October 10, 1993)
 Ang TV (October 19, 1992 – April 11, 1997)
 Home Along Da Riles (December 23, 1992 – August 10, 2003)
 Star Drama Presents (February 18, 1993 – September 8, 2001)
 SST: Salo-Salo Together (March 20, 1993 – June 30, 1995)
 Haybol Rambol (May 10, 1993 – October 13, 1995)
 Kate en Boogie (July 19, 1993 – November 24, 1994)
 Oki Doki Doc (October 23, 1993 – December 2, 2000)
 Brigada Siete (December 5, 1993 – September 29, 2001)
 Tropang Trumpo (March 12, 1994 – March 13, 1999)
 IBC Headliners (April 4, 1994 – August 5, 2011)
 Mixed N.U.T.S. (Numero Unong Terrific Show!) (May 9, 1994 – October 7, 1997)
 ATBP: Awit, Titik at Bilang na Pambata (June 5, 1994 – March 29, 1998)
 Show & Tell (July 16, 1994 – October 1, 1995)
 Citiline (November 12, 1994 – April 10, 1999)
 'Sang Linggo nAPO Sila (January 30, 1995 – November 28, 1998)
 Cristy Per Minute (January 30, 1995 – present)
 Inside Showbiz (February 1, 1995 – September 24, 1997)
 Dong Puno Live (February 2, 1995 – June 29, 2005)
 ASAP (February 5, 1995 – present)
 Sunday Night Special (February 5, 1995 – March 31, 1996)
 PCSO Lottery Draw (March 8, 1995 – present)
 Sunday Night Specials (April 7, 1996 – December 26, 1999)
 Familia Zaragoza (June 11, 1995 – September 29, 1996)
 Batang X sa TV (June 27, 1995 – February 27, 1996)
 CTN Midnite (July 10, 1995 – July 10, 1998)
 IBC TV X-Press (July 10, 1995 – August 15, 1997)
 Kadenang Kristal (July 31, 1995 – August 9, 1996)
 Katok Mga Misis (July 31, 1995 – June 5, 1998)
 T.G.I.S. (August 12, 1995 – November 28, 1999)
 Citynet Morning News (August 28, 1995 – March 31, 1999)
 Citynet Noontime/Afternoon News (August 28, 1995 – March 31, 1999)
 Citynet Evening News (August 28, 1995 – March 31, 1999)
 Citynet Late-Night News (August 28, 1995 – March 31, 1999)
 Citynet Television News (September 2, 1995 – April 4, 1999)
 Citynet Weekend News (September 2, 1995 – April 4, 1999)
 PTV News (October 2, 1995 – September 4, 2020)
 Saksi: GMA Headline Balita (October 2, 1995 – August 20, 1999)
 Emergency (October 4, 1995 — March 6, 2009)
 Startalk (October 8, 1995 – September 12, 2015)
 Bubble Gang (October 20, 1995 – present)
 Villa Quintana (November 6, 1995 – January 24, 1997)
 Calvento Files (December 4, 1995 – October 2, 1998)
 Lyra (April 8, 1996 – January 3, 1997)
 Tierra Sangre (April 15, 1996 – February 12, 1999)
 Friday Box Office (April 12, 1996 – February 20, 2004)
 Saturday Night Blockbusters (April 13, 1996 – August 2, 2008)
 Mukha ng Buhay (April 15, 1996 – January 29, 1999)
 The Kris Aquino Show (April 15, 1996 – October 25, 1996)
 Partners Mel and Jay (May 5, 1996 – February 8, 2004)
 D.A.T.S. (May 6, 1996 – November 8, 1996)
 Usapang Business (May 9, 1996 – October 26, 2002)
 Super Games (May 12, 1996 – June 29, 1997)
 Eezy Dancing (May 12, 1996 – January 25, 2002)
 Balitang K (May 20, 1996 – March 2, 2001)
 Wow Mali (May 25, 1996 – June 28, 2015)
 ABS-CBN Weekend News (June 1, 1996 – December 31, 2005)
 Alas Singko Y Medya (June 3, 1996 – August 2, 2002)
 Gimik (June 15, 1996 – February 13, 1999)
 Dateline Philippines (July 8, 1996 – present)
 Mia Gracia (August 12, 1996 – August 15, 1997)
 ETChing: Entertainment Today with Lyn Ching (August 12, 1996 – June 6, 1998)
 SNBO: Sunday Night Box Office (August 18, 1996 – May 31, 2020)
 News 23 (October 14, 1996 – September 18, 1998)
 Anna Karenina (November 10, 1996 – April 28, 2002)
 Ms. D! (November 11, 1996 – February 26, 1999)
 Flames (November 11, 1996 – January 11, 2002)
 Today with Kris Aquino (November 18, 1996 – March 9, 2001)
 GoBingo (December 9, 1996 – October 10, 2008)
 SOP (February 2, 1997 – February 28, 2010)
 Walang Tulugan with the Master Showman (February 8, 1997 – February 13, 2016)
 Esperanza (February 17, 1997 – July 30, 1999)
 Mula sa Puso (March 10, 1997 – April 9, 1999)
 Ikaw na Sana (March 17, 1997 – April 3, 1998)
 Good Morning Asia (April 7, 1997 – April 8, 1998)
 1 for 3 (April 10, 1997 – June 24, 2001)
 Kaya ni Mister, Kaya ni Misis (May 19, 1997 – September 3, 2001)
 Growing Up (June 2, 1997 – February 12, 1999)
 Wansapanataym (June 22, 1997 – April 14, 2019)
 !Oka Tokat (June 24, 1997 – May 7, 2002)
 Pira-pirasong Pangarap (August 18, 1997 – February 21, 2003)
 Del Tierro (September 15, 1997 – May 14, 1999)
 Pinoy Blockbusters (February 9, 1998 – October 26, 2002)
 Sing Galing! (March 6, 1998 – April 30, 2005)
 Mornings @ GMA (April 13, 1998 – December 3, 1999)
 Ganyan Kita Kamahal (April 13, 1998 – August 7, 1998)
 S-Files (June 7, 1998 – April 22, 2007)
 Brunch with Bing & Michelle (June 8, 1998 – February 26, 1999)
 Saturday Night Specials (July 4, 1998 – March 29, 2003)
 Knowledge Power (July 5, 1998 – February 28, 2004)
 Kasangga Mo ang Langit (July 10, 1998 – present)
 IBC Express Balita (July 13, 1998 – August 5, 2011)
 IBC Balita Ngayon (July 13, 1998 – February 18, 2000)
 Halik sa Apoy (August 10, 1998 – February 26, 1999)
 Diyos at Bayan (August 21, 1998 – present)
 Sharon (September 6, 1998 – October 3, 2010)
 Martin Late at Nite (September 7, 1998 – August 29, 2003)
 Global News (September 7, 1998 – September 7, 2001)
 News Central (September 21, 1998 – October 1, 2010)
 Kool Ka Lang (October 19, 1998 – October 17, 2003)
 Pambansang Balita Ala-Una (November 2, 1998 – July 13, 2001)
 Pambansang Balita Ala-Sais (November 2, 1998 – July 13, 2001)
 National Network News (November 2, 1998 – July 13, 2001)
 News Flash sa 4 (November 2, 1998 – July 15, 2001)
 The Correspondents (November 10, 1998 – October 19, 2010)
 Sa Sandaling Kailangan Mo Ako (November 16, 1998 – September 6, 1999)
 Debate with Mare at Pare (November 18, 1998 – November 2, 2006)
 Richard Love Lucy (November 22, 1998 – March 25, 2001)
 Maynila (November 23, 1998 – present)
 MTB (November 30, 1998 – February 4, 2005)
 NUTV Balita Ngayon (January 1, 1999 – July 13, 2001)
 i-Witness (January 18, 1999 – present)
 Marinella (February 8, 1999 – May 11, 2001)
 Cheche Lazaro Presents (February 14, 1999 – June 22, 2014)
 G-mik (February 20, 1999 – June 15, 2002)
 Ang Munting Paraiso (March 6, 1999 – June 1, 2002)
 Tarajing Potpot (March 6, 1999 – June 10, 2000)
 Beh Bote Nga (March 9, 1999 – April 23, 2003)
 Mikee Forever (March 10, 1999 – September 1, 1999)
 Tabing Ilog (March 14, 1999 – October 19, 2003)
 Breakfast (March 15, 1999 – June 22, 2007)
 Ispup (March 20, 1999 – February 15, 2004)
 Saan Ka Man Naroroon (April 12, 1999 – March 23, 2001)
 F! (April 17, 1999 – February 26, 2006)
 Di Ba't Ikaw (May 17, 1999 – October 29, 1999)
 The Buzz (June 13, 1999 – April 5, 2015)
 Alas Dose sa Trese (July 24, 1999 – November 3, 2000)
 UltraVision 25 Report (July 27, 1999 – May 3, 2000)
 Labs Ko Si Babe (August 2, 1999 – November 10, 2000) 
 Kirara, Ano ang Kulay ng Pag-ibig? (August 16, 1999 – November 2, 2001)
 Pulso: Aksyon Balita (August 16, 1999 – November 17, 2000)
 Frontpage: Ulat ni Mel Tiangco (August 23, 1999 – March 12, 2004)
 Saksi (August 23, 1999 – present)
 Pintados (September 4, 1999 – September 2, 2000) 
 Pwedeng Pwede (September 8, 1999 – October 16, 2001)
 Judy Ann Drama Special (September 13, 1999 – May 14, 2001)
 ANC Headlines (October 11, 1999 – present)
 Click (December 4, 1999 – July 24, 2004)
 Unang Hirit (December 6, 1999 – present)

2000's
 Sunday Night Movies (January 23, 2000 – November 18, 2001)
 PBA on Viva TV (February 20, 2000 – December 25, 2002)
 Ronda Trese (February 21, 2000 – January 4, 2002)
 Saturday Night Movies (March 4, 2000 – March 3, 2001)
 Biyaheng Langit (April 8, 2000 – present)
 May Bukas Pa (April 24, 2000 – May 4, 2001)
 Kiss Muna (April 29, 2000 – September 10, 2001)
 H2K: Hati-Hating Kapatid (April 29, 2000 – May 26, 2001)
 Good Morning Pilipinas (May 1, 2000 – May 5, 2017)
 Planet 25 Report (May 4, 2000 – April 27, 2001)
 Kagat ng Dilim (June 10, 2000 – present)
 Subic Bay (June 29, 2000 – May 30, 2001)
 RPN Arangkada Balita (July 3, 2000 – April 14, 2006)
 Primetime Balita (July 3, 2000 – August 10, 2001)
 Imbestigador (August 2, 2000 – present)
 Idol Ko si Kap (September 17, 2000 – September 3, 2005)
 Lunch Break (November 4, 2000 – December 12, 2003)
 Pangako Sa 'Yo (November 13, 2000 – September 20, 2002)
 Who Wants to Be a Millionaire? (November 13, 2000 – November 22, 2015)
 ABS-CBN Headlines (November 20, 2000 – July 25, 2003)
 Arriba, Arriba! (December 9, 2000 – August 9, 2003)
 Larawan: A Special Drama Engagement (February 14, 2001 – December 26, 2001)
 Biglang Sibol, Bayang Impasibol (March 12, 2001 – January 25, 2002)
 Ikaw Lang ang Mamahalin (March 26, 2001 – November 1, 2002)
 Sa Dulo ng Walang Hanggan (March 26, 2001 – February 28, 2003)
 New Day @ PTV (April 2, 2001 – July 13, 2001)
 Eto Na Ang Susunod Na Kabanata (April 21, 2001 – September 9, 2001)
 Recuerdo de Amor (May 14, 2001 – January 10, 2003)
 Ang Tamang Daan (June 11, 2001 – present)
 Sa Puso Ko Iingatan Ka (June 18, 2001 – February 14, 2003)
 Daddy Di Do Du (July 12, 2001 – July 29, 2007)
 Teledyaryo (July 16, 2001 – June 29, 2012)
 UNTV Balita Ngayon (July 16, 2001 – July 9, 2004)
 RPN NewsWatch Now (August 13, 2001 – March 9, 2007)
 SiS (August 27, 2001 – January 1, 2010)
 Whattamen (September 12, 2001 – February 18, 2004)
 Attagirl (September 13, 2001 – May 7, 2002)
 Game Ka Na Ba? (October 8, 2001 – present)
 Wheel of Fortune (November 19, 2001 – July 25, 2008)
 Family Feud (November 19, 2001 – present)
 The Price Is Right (November 25, 2001 – August 13, 2011)
 Sana ay Ikaw na Nga (December 3, 2001 – April 25, 2003)
 IBC News Tonight (January 7, 2002 – August 5, 2011)
 All-Star K! (January 13, 2002 – October 18, 2009)
 Star for a Night (March 31, 2002 – March 1, 2003)
 Kung Mawawala Ka (April 22, 2002 – June 6, 2003)
 Kahit Kailan (May 5, 2002 – July 6, 2003)
 OK Fine, 'To Ang Gusto Nyo! (May 14, 2002 – August 21, 2006)
 Tanging Yaman, The Series (June 8, 2002 – March 15, 2003)
 Wish Ko Lang! (June 29, 2002 – present)
 Ang Iibigin ay Ikaw (July 8, 2002 – April 11, 2003)
 Kay Tagal Kang Hinintay (July 8, 2002 – November 14, 2003)
 Flash Report (July 15, 2002 – March 27, 2016)
 Flash Report Special Edition (July 20, 2002 – June 17, 2007) 
 Morning Girls with Kris and Korina (July 22, 2002 – May 28, 2004)
 Magandang Umaga, Bayan (August 5, 2002 – June 3, 2005)
 Magandang Umaga, Bayan Weekend (August 10, 2002 – April 18, 2004)
 Willingly Yours (August 10, 2002 – November 1, 2003)
 Bitag (September 14, 2002 – present)
 Bituin (September 23, 2002 – May 23, 2003)
 Habang Kapiling Ka (November 4, 2002 – October 17, 2003)
 Blockbusters Cinema (November 2, 2002 – September 7, 2003)
 Bida si Mister, Bida si Misis (November 16, 2002 – February 8, 2005)
 Berks (November 16, 2002 – March 20, 2004)
 Magpakailanman (December 2, 2002 – present)
 PBA on NBN/IBC (February 23, 2003 – December 14, 2003)
 Nagmamahal, Manay Gina (February 24, 2003 – August 29, 2003)
 Darating ang Umaga (March 3, 2003 – November 14, 2003)
 RPN News Update (March 22, 2003 – January 4, 2008)
 S2: Showbiz Sabado (March 22, 2003 – September 13, 2003)
 Dee's Day (April 10, 2003 – December 28, 2007)
 Ang Iibigin ay Ikaw Pa Rin (April 14, 2003 – August 22, 2003)
 Nuts Entertainment (April 30, 2003 – December 27, 2008)
 Sana'y Wala Nang Wakas (May 19, 2003 – July 9, 2004)
 Basta't Kasama Kita (May 26, 2003 – September 10, 2004)
 Narito ang Puso Ko (June 9, 2003 – March 5, 2004)
 Search for a Star (June 21, 2003 – March 13, 2004)
 Kidcetera (June 28, 2003 – November 29, 2003)
 Love to Love (July 13, 2003 – October 22, 2006)
 Hawak Ko ang Langit (July 14, 2003 – November 7, 2003)
 ABS-CBN Insider (July 28, 2003 – June 30, 2006)
 Daisy Siete (September 1, 2003 – July 2, 2010)
 Lagot Ka, Isusumbong Kita (October 20, 2003 – April 9, 2007)
 Twin Hearts (October 20, 2003 – June 18, 2004)
 All Together Now (October 21, 2003 – September 7, 2004)
 Starstruck (October 27, 2003 – September 15, 2019)
 Star in a Million (November 8, 2003 – August 21, 2004)
 Walang Hanggan (November 10, 2003 – February 27, 2004)
 Retro TV (November 17, 2003 – February 20, 2004)
 Meteor Fever in Manila (November 17, 2003 – December 5, 2003)
 Kay Susan Tayo! (November 30, 2003 – October 25, 2009)
 Bio Data (December 2, 2003 – September 7, 2004)
 It Might Be You (December 15, 2003 – December 10, 2004)
 Te Amo, Maging Sino Ka Man (February 2, 2004 – September 17, 2004)
 At Home Ka Dito (February 8, 2004 – August 12, 2007)
 TV Patrol Sabado (February 14, 2004 – June 26, 2010)
 Partners with Mel Tiangco (February 15, 2004 – July 25, 2004)
 PBA on ABC (February 22, 2004 – August 20, 2008)
 Marina (February 23, 2004 – November 12, 2004)
 Sarah the Teen Princess (March 1, 2004 – October 22, 2004)
 Ikaw sa Puso Ko (March 1, 2004 – October 1, 2004)
 Star Circle Quest (March 1, 2004 – February 19, 2011)
 Wazzup Wazzup (March 1, 2004 – July 20, 2007)
 Nginiiig (March 6, 2004 – April 8, 2006)
 Lukso ng Dugo (March 7, 2004 – May 30, 2004)
 Hanggang Kailan (March 8, 2004 – August 13, 2004)
 24 Oras (March 15, 2004 – present)
 Saksi: Liga ng Katotohanan (March 15, 2004 – February 18, 2011)
 StarStruck Kids (March 20, 2004 – June 26, 2004)
 Mangarap Ka (March 29, 2004 – October 8, 2004)
 Lovely Day (April 3, 2004 – May 23, 2009)
 Sentro (April 12, 2004 – August 8, 2008)
 Big News Ngayon (April 12, 2004 – October 1, 2006)
 Art Angel (April 17, 2004 – May 14, 2011)
 Salamat Dok (April 24, 2004 – March 15, 2020)
 TV Patrol Linggo (May 9, 2004 – June 27, 2010)
 Rated Korina (May 16, 2004 – present)
 Chowtime Na! (May 17, 2004 – October 6, 2006)
 ASAP Fanatic (May 23, 2004 – June 25, 2006)
 Good Morning, Kris (May 31, 2004 – October 8, 2004)
 Reporter's Notebook (June 1, 2004 – January 13, 2022)
 SOP Gigsters (June 13, 2004 – October 22, 2006)
 EK Channel (June 19, 2004 – January 29, 2005)
 Marinara (June 21, 2004 – October 1, 2004)
 30 Days (June 28, 2004 – August 13, 2004)
 Pinoy Pop Superstar (July 3, 2004 – June 2, 2007)
 Bitoy's Funniest Videos (July 3, 2004 – October 10, 2009)
 Hiram (July 12, 2004 – May 20, 2005)
 SCQ Reload (July 12, 2004 – June 12, 2005)
 Ito Ang Balita (July 12, 2004 – present)
 Mel and Joey (August 1, 2004 – July 17, 2011)
 Mulawin (August 2, 2004 – March 18, 2005)
 Joyride (August 16, 2004 – March 11, 2005)
 Born Diva (August 28, 2004 – March 27, 2005)
 Wag Kukurap (August 28, 2004 – April 29, 2006)
 Out! (September 4, 2004 – December 4, 2004)
 Bahay Mo Ba 'To? (September 14, 2004 – July 10, 2007)
 Forever in My Heart (September 27, 2004 – January 7, 2005)
 D'X-Man (October 11, 2004 – present)
 Krystala (October 11, 2004 – April 22, 2005)
 Morning Star (October 11, 2004 – January 28, 2005)
 Newsbeat (October 11, 2004 – August 10, 2007)
 Leya, ang Pinakamagandang Babae sa Ilalim ng Lupa (October 18, 2004 – January 28, 2005)
 Kapuso Mo, Jessica Soho (November 7, 2004 – present)
 TV Patrol World (November 22, 2004 – June 29, 2010)
 Showbiz No. 1 (November 22, 2004 – July 1, 2005)
 Spirits (December 13, 2004 – May 6, 2005)
 Saang Sulok ng Langit (January 3, 2005 – August 12, 2005)
 'Til Death Do Us Part (January 31, 2005 – May 13, 2005)
 Homeboy (January 31, 2005 – June 29, 2007)
 M.R.S. (Most Requested Show) (January 31, 2005 – June 24, 2005)
 Wowowee (February 5, 2005 – July 30, 2010)
 Goin' Bulilit (February 6, 2005 – August 4, 2019)
 Bora: Sons of the Beach (February 15, 2005 – April 11, 2006)
 StarDance (February 19, 2005 – May 21, 2005)
 Quizon Avenue (March 5, 2005 – July 22, 2006)
 Search for the Star in a Million (March 13, 2003 – January 22, 2006)
 Now and Forever (March 14, 2005 – November 24, 2006)
 Kamao: Matirang Matibay (March 14, 2005 – May 20, 2005)
 Darna (April 4, 2005 – November 25, 2005)
 Pinoy Abroad (April 6, 2005 – June 28, 2006)
 Showbiz Stripped (April 16, 2005 – February 10, 2007)
 Encantadia (May 2, 2005 – December 9, 2005)
 Bubble Gang Jr. (May 8, 2005 – July 10, 2005)
 Mga Anghel na Walang Langit (May 9, 2005 – February 24, 2006)
 Ikaw ang Lahat sa Akin (May 16, 2005 – November 4, 2005)
 Dokyu (May 18, 2005 – August 10, 2007)
 Hollywood Dream (May 22, 2005 – November 20, 2005)
 Qpids (May 23, 2005 – September 25, 2005)
 My Juan and Only (May 28, 2005 – January 28, 2006)
 Magandang Umaga, Pilipinas (June 6, 2005 – June 22, 2007)
 Kampanerang Kuba (June 6, 2005 – December 16, 2005)
 Club TV (June 11, 2005 – November 5, 2005)
 Teledyaryo Sabado (June 25, 2005 – April 21, 2007)
 Teledyaryo Linggo (June 26, 2005 – April 22, 2007)
 Sugo (July 4, 2005 – February 10, 2006)
 Pilipinas, Gising Ka Na Ba? (July 4, 2005 – July 20, 2007)
 Ang Mahiwagang Baul (July 17, 2005 – January 28, 2007)
 Kung Mamahalin Mo Lang Ako (August 15, 2005 – February 17, 2006)
 Pinoy Big Brother (August 21, 2005 – May 29, 2022)
 News Patrol (September 5, 2005 – present)
 Makuha Ka sa Tikim (September 10, 2005 – November 24, 2006)
 Vietnam Rose (September 19, 2005 – February 10, 2006)
 Little Big Star (September 24, 2005 – February 3, 2007)
 Hataw Balita (September 26, 2005 – October 13, 2017)
 HP: To the Highest Level Na! (October 1, 2005 – July 14, 2007)
 Totoo TV (October 31, 2005 – October 7, 2011)
 S.O.S.: Stories of Survival (November 3, 2005 - 2008)
 Shall We Dance (November 6, 2005 – March 28, 2010)
 Panday (November 7, 2005 – May 26, 2006)
 Flash Report sa QTV (November 11, 2005 – March 18, 2007)
 Balitanghali (November 11, 2005 – present)
 News on Q (November 11, 2005 – February 18, 2011)
 Moms (November 11, 2005 – January 16, 2009)
 Laugh to Laugh: Ang Kulit! (November 11, 2005 – April 28, 2006)
 Day Off (November 12, 2005 – May 25, 2019)
 Candies (November 12, 2005 – June 17, 2006)
 Ay, Robot! (November 12, 2005 – September 8, 2007)
 Ang Pinaka (November 13, 2005 – March 15, 2020)
 My Guardian Abby (November 15, 2005 – April 28, 2006)
 BalikBayan (November 16, 2005 – February 18, 2011)
 Popstar Kids (November 19, 2005 – July 29, 2007)
 Na-Scam Ka Na Ba? (November 20, 2005 – April 8, 2006)
 S.O.C.O.: Scene of the Crime Operatives (November 23, 2005 – October 17, 2020)
 H3O: Ha Ha Ha Over (December 5, 2005 – August 6, 2007)
 Gulong ng Palad (January 9, 2006 – May 12, 2006)
 Komiks (February 4, 2006 – August 8, 2009)
 Trip na Trip (February 5, 2006 – July 22, 2011)
 Your Song (February 12, 2006 – March 27, 2011)
 Encantadia: Pag-ibig Hanggang Wakas (February 20, 2006 – April 28, 2006)
 Agawin Mo Man ang Lahat (February 20, 2006 – August 11, 2006)
 Hongkong Flight 143 (February 20, 2006 – May 12, 2006)
 Sa Piling Mo (February 27, 2006 – August 25, 2006)
 XXX: Exklusibong, Explosibong, Exposé (March 4, 2006 – February 18, 2013)
 Us Girls (March 5, 2006 – May 26, 2012)
 PTV Sports (March 5, 2006 – present)
 Gudtaym (March 10, 2006 – August 25, 2006)
 Majika (March 20, 2006 – September 29, 2006)
 Tribe (March 25, 2006 – August 3, 2019)
 Hapinas (April 1, 2006 – February 1, 2008)
 Urban Zone (April 16, 2006 – January 20, 2012)
 RPN NewsWatch Aksyon Balita (April 17, 2006 – January 4, 2008)
 Noel (April 24, 2006 – June 30, 2006)
 Fantastikids (May 6, 2006 – December 9, 2006)
 Bituing Walang Ningning (May 15, 2006 – October 6, 2006)
 I Luv NY (May 15, 2006 – September 8, 2006)
 Calla Lily (May 29, 2006 – September 15, 2006)
 Captain Barbell (May 29, 2006 – January 12, 2007)
 Let's Go! (June 3, 2006 – May 19, 2007)
 Kapamilya, Deal or No Deal (June 5, 2006 – March 4, 2016)
 U Can Dance (June 11, 2006 – October 13, 2007)
 Posh (June 24, 2006 – December 23, 2006)
 Pinoy Meets World (June 25, 2006 – January 25, 2009)
 The Beat (June 26, 2006 – February 14, 2011)
 Bandila (July 3, 2006 – March 17, 2020)
 Mornings @ ANC (July 3, 2006 – February 24, 2017)
 First Look (July 3, 2006 – October 23, 2015)
 100% Pinoy! (July 5, 2006 – September 25, 2008)
 Love Spell (July 9, 2006 – March 23, 2008)
 Ang Pagbabago (July 10, 2006 – September 1, 2006)
 John en Shirley (July 29, 2006 – October 27, 2007)
 Star Magic Presents (July 29, 2006 – May 10, 2008)
 Teka Mona! (July 29, 2006 – May 19, 2007)
 Philippine Idol (July 30, 2006 – December 10, 2006)
 O-Ha! (August 7, 2006 – January 26, 2007)
 Games Uplate Live (August 7, 2006 – October 3, 2009)
 Pinakamamahal (August 14, 2006 – November 3, 2006)
 Swak na Swak (August 22, 2006 – present)
 Pinoy Dream Academy (August 27, 2006 – October 5, 2008)
 Sunday's Best (August 27, 2006 – present) 
 Super Inggo (August 28, 2006 – February 9, 2007)
 Noypi, Ikaw Ba ‘To? (August 28, 2006 – March 17, 2008)
 Crazy for You (September 11, 2006 – December 29, 2006)
 Bakekang (September 11, 2006 – March 30, 2007)
 Atlantika (October 2, 2006 – February 9, 2007)
 ABC News Alert (October 2, 2006 – August 8, 2008)
 Maging Sino Ka Man (October 9, 2006 – May 25, 2007)
 Kapuso Movie Festival (October 29, 2006 – present) 
 Makita Ka Lang Muli (November 6, 2006 – February 16, 2007)
 Palaban (November 8, 2006 – November 14, 2007)
 Asian Treasures (January 15, 2007 – June 29, 2007)
 Little Big Superstar (February 10, 2007 – May 12, 2007)
 Sine Totoo (February 17, 2007 – February 28, 2009)
 Sineserye Presents (March 5, 2007 – October 2, 2009)
 Showbiz Ka! (March 5, 2007 – June 1, 2007)
 RPN iWatch News (March 12, 2007 – January 11, 2008)
 Philippines' Next Top Model (March 13, 2007 – May 30, 2017)
 Flash Report sa Q (March 19, 2007 – April 8, 2007)
 Here Comes the Bride (March 22, 2007 – June 28, 2007)
 Philippine Agenda (March 25, 2007 – May 13, 2007)
 Spoon (March 25, 2007 – August 9, 2015)
 Minuto (April 9, 2007 – August 8, 2010)
 One Morning Cafe (April 9, 2007 – June 29, 2010)
 Live on Q (April 9, 2007 – February 20, 2011)
 Fantastic Man (April 14, 2007 – November 10, 2007)
 Rounin (April 16, 2007 – July 26, 2007)
 Who's Your Daddy Now? (April 16, 2007 – July 13, 2007)
 Walang Kapalit (April 23, 2007 – August 31, 2007)
 Showbiz Central (April 29, 2007 – July 29, 2012)
 Sine Novela (April 30, 2007 – October 22, 2010)
 Tok! Tok! Tok! Isang Milyon Pasok (May 27, 2007 – November 2, 2008)
 Mommy Elvie's Problematic Show (June 19, 2007 – August 5, 2008)
 GMA Weekend Report (June 23, 2007 – February 20, 2010)
 Boys Nxt Door (June 24, 2007 – January 13, 2008)
 Umagang Kay Ganda (June 25, 2007 – May 5, 2020)
 Ysabella (June 25, 2007 – January 25, 2008)
 Boy & Kris (July 2, 2007 – February 13, 2009)
 Mga Mata ni Anghelita (July 2, 2007 – October 5, 2007)
 Good Morning Kuya (July 23, 2007 – present)
 Margarita (July 30, 2007 – September 21, 2007)
 Entertainment Live (August 4, 2007 – January 28, 2012)
 Ful Haus (August 5, 2007 – August 16, 2009)
 Kokey (August 6, 2007 – November 9, 2007)
 Celebrity Duets (August 11, 2007 – November 14, 2009)
 i-Balita (August 13, 2007 – October 21, 2011)
 Marimar (August 13, 2007 – March 14, 2008)
 Kap's Amazing Stories (August 19, 2007 – July 6, 2014)
 1 vs. 100 (August 25, 2007 – April 19, 2008)
 Kabarkada, Break the Bank (August 27, 2007 – December 28, 2007)
 Pangarap na Bituin (September 3, 2007 – December 7, 2007)
 Zaido: Pulis Pangkalawakan (September 24, 2007 – February 8, 2008)
 Lastikman (September 24, 2007 – January 25, 2008)
 Prinsesa ng Banyera (October 8, 2007 – May 23, 2008)
 Kakasa Ka Ba sa Grade 5? (October 27, 2007 – May 9, 2009)
 Super Inggo 1.5: Ang Bagong Bangis (November 3, 2007 – December 15, 2007)
 Princess Sarah (November 12, 2007 – December 21, 2007)
 Kamandag (November 19, 2007 – April 25, 2008)
 Born to Be Wild (November 28, 2007 – present)
 Pinoy Records (December 8, 2007 – July 17, 2010)
 Volta (January 26, 2008 – March 15, 2008)
 Kung Fu Kids (January 28, 2008 – April 25, 2008)
 Lobo (January 28, 2008 – July 11, 2008)
 Palos (January 28, 2008 – April 25, 2008)
 E.S.P. (February 7, 2008 – May 8, 2008)
 Joaquin Bordado (February 11, 2008 – July 11, 2008)
 Gaby's Xtraordinary Files (March 23, 2008 – June 8, 2008)
 Babangon Ako't Dudurugin Kita (March 24, 2008 – June 27, 2008)
 Matanglawin (March 24, 2008 – May 3, 2020)
 I Am KC (March 29, 2008 – April 19, 2008)
 Pinoy Idol (April 5, 2008 – August 17, 2008)
 Tasya Fantasya (April 6, 2008 – July 13, 2008)
 Batingaw (April 7, 2008 – August 6, 2010)
 Jollitown (April 13, 2008 – October 12, 2013)
 The Singing Bee (April 21, 2008 – February 6, 2015)
 Batingaw (April 21, 2008 – August 13, 2010)
 Ligaw Na Bulaklak (May 26, 2008 – October 24, 2008)
 My Girl (May 26, 2008 – September 5, 2008)
 Ako si Kim Samsoon (June 30, 2008 – October 10, 2008)
 That's My Job (July 5, 2008 – August 8, 2008)
 Wonder Mom (July 5, 2008 – October 24, 2009)
 Iisa Pa Lamang (July 14, 2008 – November 7, 2008)
 Codename: Asero (July 14, 2008 – November 14, 2008)
 Dear Friend (July 20, 2008 – May 16, 2010)
 Bread N' Butter (July 23, 2008 – July 12, 2016)
 Project Runway Philippines (July 30, 2008 – September 20, 2015)
 Ka-Blog! (August 9, 2008 – October 2, 2010)
 Dear Friend (August 10, 2008 – May 16, 2010)
 Dyosa (August 11, 2008 – January 16, 2009)
 Juicy! (August 11, 2008 – August 3, 2012)
 Midnight DJ (August 11, 2008 – May 14, 2011)
 TEN: The Evening News (August 11, 2008 – March 31, 2010)
 i-News (August 11, 2008 – October 21, 2011)
 Hataw Balita News Update (August 11, 2008 – January 6, 2012)
 Ogags (August 13, 2008 – March 31, 2010)
 Rakista (August 14, 2008 – November 20, 2008)
 Obra (August 14, 2008 – November 27, 2008)
 Lokomoko (August 15, 2008 – September 1, 2013)
 Batang X: The Next Generation (August 15, 2008 – November 14, 2008)
 Lipgloss (August 16, 2008 – August 29, 2009)
 Ripley's Believe It or Not! (August 18, 2008 – September 22, 2010)
 Masquerade (August 20, 2008 – March 11, 2009)
 Philippines Scariest Challenge (August 22, 2008 – September 3, 2009)
 I Love Betty La Fea (September 8, 2008 – April 24, 2009)
 Kahit Isang Saglit (September 15, 2008 – November 28, 2008)
 Survivor Philippines (September 15, 2008 – February 19, 2012)
 Kalye, Mga Kwento ng Lansangan (September 22, 2008 – October 5, 2009)
 DoQmentaries (September 27, 2008 – December 6, 2009)
 Case Unclosed (October 2, 2008 – February 25, 2010)
 PBA on Solar Sports (October 4, 2008 – August 21, 2011)
 True Confections (October 4, 2008 – August 31, 2010)
 Banana Sundae (October 11, 2008 – April 5, 2020)
 LaLola (October 13, 2008 – February 6, 2009)
 Gagambino (October 20, 2008 – February 20, 2008)
 Pieta (October 27, 2008 – May 1, 2009)
 Counterpoint with Secretary Salvador Panelo (October 29, 2008 – present)
 Batang Bibbo! (November 8, 2008 – November 21, 2009)
 Pinoy Fear Factor (November 10, 2008 – February 13, 2009)
 Luna Mystika (November 17, 2008 – March 6, 2009)
 Everybody Hapi (November 23, 2008 – September 4, 2010)
 Ha Ha Hayop (November 24, 2008 – August 31, 2009)
 Kiddie Kwela (November 25, 2008 – March 30, 2010)
 Rescue Mission (November 27, 2008 – February 5, 2009)
 Eva Fonda (December 1, 2008 – February 6, 2009)
 Parekoy (January 5, 2009 – April 17, 2009)
 Tayong Dalawa (January 19, 2009 – September 25, 2009)
 May Bukas Pa (February 2, 2009 – February 5, 2010)
 Ang Babaeng Hinugot sa Aking Tadyang (February 2, 2009 – May 1, 2009)
 Ruffa & Ai (February 16, 2009 – October 23, 2009)
 SNN: Showbiz News Ngayon (February 16, 2009 – September 9, 2011)
 Totoy Bato (February 23, 2009 – July 3, 2009)
 All About Eve (March 9, 2009 – June 5, 2009)
 OFW Diaries (March 13, 2009 – January 14, 2011)
 Cool Center (March 14, 2009 – April 17, 2010)
 I Survived: Hindi Sumusuko Ang Pinoy (March 19, 2009 – December 2, 2010)
 Zorro (March 23, 2009 – August 7, 2009)
 SRO Cinemaserye (March 26, 2009 – April 8, 2010)
 Pinoy Bingo Night (March 30, 2009 – June 26, 2009)
 Hole in the Wall (April 20, 2009 – November 27, 2010)
 Kambal sa Uma (April 20, 2009 – October 9, 2009)
 Teledyaryo Weekend (April 25, 2009 – July 1, 2012)
 Only You (April 27, 2009 – August 21, 2009)
 Precious Hearts Romances Presents (May 4, 2009 – September 27, 2019)
 Power of 10 (May 10, 2009 – December 27, 2009)
 Are You the Next Big Star? (May 16, 2009 – August 23, 2009)
 Happy Land (June 6, 2009 – March 27, 2010)
 All My Life (June 29, 2009 – September 18, 2009)
 The Wedding (June 29, 2009 – September 4, 2009)
 Rosalinda (July 6, 2009 – November 27, 2009)
 Darna (August 10, 2009 – February 19, 2010)
 Agimat: Ang Mga Alamat ni Ramon Revilla (August 15, 2009 – March 18, 2011)
 Show Me Da Manny (August 23, 2009 – July 10, 2011)
 Katorse (August 24, 2009 – January 8, 2010)
 Stairway to Heaven (September 14, 2009 – December 11, 2009)
 Ikaw Sana (September 21, 2009 – February 5, 2010)
 Lovers in Paris (September 28, 2009 – December 11, 2009)
 Nagsimula sa Puso (October 12, 2009 – January 22, 2010)
 Bitoy's Showwwtime (October 17, 2009 – March 13, 2010)
 Failon Ngayon (October 24, 2009 – May 2, 2020)
 It's Showtime (October 24, 2009 – present)
 BandaOke! Rock 'N Roll to Millions (October 25, 2009 – March 21, 2010)
 Kulilits (October 31, 2009 – September 18, 2010)
 Full House (November 30, 2009 – February 26, 2010)
 The Bottomline with Boy Abunda (November 28, 2009 – May 2, 2020)
 RPN NewsCap (November 30, 2009 – October 29, 2012)
 Sana Ngayong Pasko (December 7, 2009 – January 8, 2010)
 Tweetbiz Insiders (December 7, 2009 – June 3, 2011)
 Tropang Potchi (December 19, 2009 – February 14, 2015)

2010's
 Tanging Yaman (January 11, 2010 – May 21, 2010)
 The Last Prince (January 11, 2010 – June 25, 2010)
 True Stories (January 17, 2010 – January 23, 2011)
 Kung Tayo'y Magkakalayo (January 18, 2010 – July 9, 2010)
 Laff En Roll (January 19, 2010 – September 23, 2010)
 Magkano ang Iyong Dangal? (January 25, 2010 – May 14, 2010)
 Habang May Buhay (February 1, 2010 – May 14, 2010)
 Balitanghali Weekend (February 6, 2010 – March 15, 2020)
 Diz Iz It! (February 8, 2010 – July 24, 2010)
 First Time (February 8, 2010 – May 28, 2010)
 Agua Bendita (February 8, 2010 – September 3, 2010)
 Q-Lets and Co. (February 14, 2010 – May 9, 2010)
 Rubi (February 15, 2010 – August 13, 2010)
 24 Oras Weekend (February 21, 2010 – present)
 Melason (February 22, 2010 – March 31, 2010)
 Panday Kids (February 22, 2010 – June 4, 2010)
 Family Matters (March 13, 2010 – December 31, 2016)
 Tutok Tulfo (March 13, 2010 – August 4, 2012)
 USI: Under Special Investigation (March 14, 2010 – August 5, 2012)
 Wipeout! Matira Ang Matibay (March 15, 2010 – September 21, 2010)
 Music Uplate Live (March 15, 2010 – September 2, 2011)
 Face to Face (March 22, 2010 – October 11, 2013)
 Party Pilipinas (March 28, 2010 – May 19, 2013)
 Pepito Manaloto (March 28, 2010 – present)
 Aha! (April 4, 2010 – present)
 My Darwing Aswang (April 4, 2010 – May 15, 2011)
 Pidol's Wonderland (April 4, 2010 – September 8, 2013)
 Aksyon (April 5, 2010 – March 13, 2020)
 Aksyon Ngayon (April 5, 2010 – October 24, 2010)
 Tonight with Arnold Clavio (April 5, 2010 – March 11, 2020)
 Sapul sa Singko (April 5, 2010 – February 3, 2012)
 Journo (April 6, 2010 – July 31, 2012)
 X-Life (April 7, 2010 – February 16, 2011)
 Claudine (April 10, 2010 – August 7, 2010)
 Sunnyville (April 10, 2010 – November 13, 2010)
 Aksyon Weekend (April 10, 2010 – July 12, 2014)
 BFGF (April 11, 2010 – January 30, 2011)
 P.O.5. (April 11, 2010 – February 20, 2011)
 Paparazzi (April 11, 2010 – July 28, 2012)
 Wachamakulit (April 16, 2010 – September 24, 2010)
 Comedy Bar (April 24, 2010 – October 29, 2011)
 I Laugh Sabado (April 24, 2010 – February 26, 2011)
 Take Me Out (April 26, 2010 – July 2, 2010)
 Fastbreak News (May 10, 2010 – August 24, 2012)
 Rescue (May 13, 2010 – February 14, 2013)
 Rosalka (May 17, 2010 – October 22, 2010)
 Love Bug (May 23, 2010 – September 19, 2010)
 Simply KC (May 24, 2010 – October 22, 2010)
 Momay (May 24, 2010 – September 17, 2010)
 Langit sa Piling Mo (May 31, 2010 – September 17, 2010)
 Pilyang Kerubin (June 7, 2010 – September 10, 2010)
 Pinoy M.D. (June 12, 2010 – present)
 Trudis Liit (June 21, 2010 – October 22, 2010)
 Endless Love (June 28, 2010 – October 15, 2010)
 Magkaribal (June 28, 2010 – November 5, 2010)
 Panahon Ko 'to!: Ang Game Show ng Buhay Ko (June 28, 2010 – November 26, 2010)
 Twist and Shout (July 3, 2010 – October 16, 2010)
 M3: Malay Mo Ma-develop (July 3, 2010 – November 27, 2010)
 TV Patrol Weekend (July 3, 2010 – present)
 Get It Straight with Daniel Razon (July 5, 2010 – present)
 Danz Showdown (July 5, 2010 – October 1, 2010)
 Noah (July 12, 2010 – February 4, 2011)
 Kaya ng Powers (July 24, 2010 – November 13, 2010)
 Pilipinas Win Na Win (July 31, 2010 – December 31, 2010)
 Ilumina (August 2, 2010 – November 19, 2010)
 Love ni Mister, Love ni Misis (August 9, 2010 – March 4, 2011)
 Teledyaryo News Bulletin (August 9, 2010  – July 1, 2012)
 JejeMom (August 14, 2010 – November 13, 2010)
 Anatomy of a Disaster (August 22, 2010 – November 6, 2011)
 Ang Yaman ni Lola (August 23, 2010 – January 21, 2011)
 1DOL (September 6, 2010 – October 22, 2010)
 Wow Meganaon (September 6, 2010 – April 8, 2011)
 Lady Dada (September 8, 2010 – October 6, 2010)
 Alagang Kapatid (September 11, 2010 – October 10, 2020)
 Star Factor (September 12, 2010 – December 5, 2010)
 Grazilda (September 13, 2010 – January 7, 2011)
 Asar Talo Lahat Panalo! (September 18, 2010 – November 20, 2010)
 Kokey at Ako (September 20, 2010 – December 3, 2010)
 Bantatay (September 20, 2010 – February 25, 2011)
 Reel Love Presents Tween Hearts (September 26, 2010 – June 10, 2012)
 Imortal (October 4, 2010 – April 29, 2011)
 Iba-Balita (October 4, 2010 – January 16, 2014)
 Star Power (October 10, 2010 – February 20, 2011)
 Koreana (October 11, 2010 – February 25, 2011)
 Beauty Queen (October 18, 2010 – February 4, 2011)
 Wil Time Bigtime (October 23, 2010 – January 5, 2013)
 Aksyon JournalisMO (October 25, 2010 – February 17, 2012)
 Little Star (October 25, 2010 – February 11, 2011)
 Juanita Banana (October 25, 2010 – February 18, 2011)
 Aksyon Alert (October 25, 2010 – August 13, 2017)
 Mara Clara (October 25, 2010 – June 3, 2011)
 My Driver Sweet Lover (October 25, 2010 – February 4, 2011)
 Patrol ng Pilipino (October 26, 2010 – February 19, 2013)
 Balitaang Tapat (November 1, 2010 – May 11, 2012)
 Extra Express (November 25, 2010 – June 2, 2011)
 Shoutout! (November 29, 2010 – February 11, 2011)
 Jillian: Namamasko Po (November 29, 2010 – January 21, 2011)
 Laugh Out Loud (December 4, 2010 – June 18, 2011)
 Sabel (December 6, 2010 – March 11, 2011)
 Puso ng Pasko: Artista Challenge (December 6, 2010 – December 31, 2010)
 Krusada (December 9, 2010 – February 21, 2013)
 Tunay na Buhay (January 21, 2011 – January 12, 2022)
 Wanted (January 28, 2011 – July 30, 2012)
 Mutya (January 31, 2011 – May 6, 2011)
 Babaeng Hampaslupa (February 7, 2011 – July 15, 2011)
 I Heart You, Pare (February 7, 2011 – May 27, 2011)
 Happy Yipee Yehey! (February 12, 2011 – February 4, 2012)
 Andar ng mga Balita (February 21, 2011 – July 11, 2014)
 Brigada (February 28, 2011 – present)
 Dobol B TV (February 28, 2011 – present)
 iJuander (February 28, 2011 – present)
 In the Limelight (February 28, 2011 – October 7, 2011)
 Magic Palayok (February 28, 2011 – July 1, 2011)
 My Lover, My Wife (February 28, 2011 – May 27, 2011)
 News to Go (February 28, 2011 – May 31, 2019)
 News Live (February 28, 2011 – present)
 On Call: Serbisyong Totoo. Ngayon. (February 28, 2011 – May 30, 2012)
 CNN Konek (February 28, 2011 – August 30, 2013)
 Dream Home (February 28, 2011 – April 29, 2016)
 State of the Nation (February 28, 2011 – present)
 Best Men (March 1, 2011 – December 30, 2013)
 Pop Talk (March 1, 2011 – present)
 Bawal ang Pasaway kay Mareng Winnie (March 2, 2011 – March 17, 2020)
 Fashbook (March 2, 2011 – February 12, 2014)
 Investigative Documentaries (March 3, 2011 – March 12, 2020)
 May Tamang Balita (March 4, 2011 – February 7, 2013)
 Balita Pilipinas Primetime (March 5, 2011 – February 15, 2014)
 Weekend Getaway (March 5, 2011 – January 25, 2013)
 Good News Kasama si Vicky Morales (March 6, 2011 – present)
 Reel Time (March 6, 2011 – March 13, 2020)
 Iba-Balita Ngayon (March 7, 2011 – August 3, 2012)
 Bilis Balita (March 7, 2011 – January 16, 2014)
 Minsan Lang Kita Iibigin (March 7, 2011 – August 19, 2011)
 Mga Nagbabagang Bulaklak (March 21, 2011 – June 17, 2011)
 Spooky Nights (March 26, 2011 – April 28, 2012)
 Captain Barbell (March 28, 2011 – July 29, 2011)
 Mula sa Puso (March 28, 2011 – August 12, 2011)
 Good Vibes (April 3, 2011 – August 28, 2011)
 Kitchen Superstar (April 4, 2011 – July 1, 2011)
 Star Box (April 4, 2011 – May 13, 2011)
 Amazing Cooking Kids (April 16, 2011 – July 16, 2011)
 Mind Master (April 30, 2011 – July 24, 2011)
 News Light (May 2, 2011 – November 29, 2019)
 100 Days to Heaven (May 9, 2011 – November 18, 2011)
 Munting Heredera (May 9, 2011 – February 3, 2012)
 My Chubby World (May 14, 2011 – August 6, 2011)
 Bagets: Just Got Lucky (May 15, 2011 – February 12, 2012)
 Blusang Itim (May 16, 2011 – August 12, 2011)
 Sabadabadog! (May 21, 2011 – November 19, 2011)
 Gandang Gabi, Vice! (May 22, 2011 – March 8, 2020)
 Andres de Saya (May 28, 2011 – August 21, 2011)
 Amaya (May 30, 2011 – January 13, 2012)
 The Biggest Loser Pinoy Edition (May 30, 2011 – April 26, 2014)
 Sisid (May 30, 2011 – September 16, 2011)
 Guns and Roses (June 6, 2011 – September 23, 2011)
 Hey It's Saberdey! (June 18, 2011 – February 4, 2012)
 Kris TV (June 27, 2011 – April 15, 2016)
 Idol sa Kusina (July 3, 2011 – December 20, 2020)
 Futbolilits (July 4, 2011 – October 14, 2011)
 Follow That Star (July 9, 2011 – February 15, 2014)
 Balita Pilipinas Ngayon (July 11, 2011 – May 31, 2019)
 I Dare You (July 11, 2011 – December 28, 2013)
 Reputasyon (July 11, 2011 – January 20, 2012)
 Motorcycle Diaries (July 15, 2011 – March 16, 2017)
 Manny Many Prizes (July 16, 2011 – December 2, 2012)
 Rod Santiago's The Sisters (July 18, 2011 – September 9, 2011)
 Personalan (July 25, 2011 – October 18, 2013)
 News TV Quick Response Team (August 1, 2011 – January 15, 2021)
 News Team 13 (August 8, 2011 – February 11, 2019)
 Mondo Manu (August 8, 2011 – July 8, 2014)
 My Binondo Girl (August 22, 2011 – January 20, 2012)
 Junior MasterChef Pinoy Edition (August 27, 2011 – February 18, 2012)
 Iglot (August 29, 2011 – November 11, 2011)
 Growing Up (September 4, 2011 – February 12, 2012)
 Protégé (September 4, 2011 – October 21, 2012)
 Kumare Klub (September 5, 2011 – February 3, 2012)
 T3: Alliance (September 5, 2011 – April 30, 2016)
 Buhay OFW (September 10, 2011 – March 30, 2019)
 Nasaan Ka, Elisa? (September 12, 2011 – January 13, 2012)
 Pinoy Explorer (September 18, 2011 – March 15, 2014)
 Kung Aagawin Mo ang Langit (September 19, 2011 – February 3, 2012)
 PBA on One Sports (October 2, 2011 – present)
 Sa Ngalan ng Ina (October 3, 2011 – November 4, 2011)
 Ako Ang Simula (October 8, 2011 – February 20, 2013)
 Primetime on ANC (October 10, 2011 – January 9, 2015)
 Ikaw Lang ang Mamahalin (October 10, 2011 – February 10, 2012)
 Budoy (October 10, 2011 – March 9, 2012)
 Daldalita (October 17, 2011 – February 3, 2012)
 ETCETERA (October 23, 2011 – December 3, 2015)
 Sanib Puwersa (October 23, 2011 – November 13, 2011)
 Pambansang Almusal (October 24, 2011 – August 27, 2021)
 Mata ng Agila (October 24, 2011 – present)
 Eagle News International (October 24, 2011 – April 1, 2022)
 Real Confessions (November 5, 2011 – February 11, 2012)
 Regal Shocker (November 5, 2011 – April 28, 2012)
 The Jose and Wally Show Starring Vic Sotto (November 5, 2011 – September 8, 2012)
 Toda Max (November 5, 2011 – November 16, 2013)
 Glamorosa (November 7, 2011 – February 10, 2012)
 Angelito: Batang Ama (November 14, 2011 – April 13, 2012)
 Ikaw ay Pag-Ibig (November 21, 2011 – January 27, 2012)
 P. S. I Love You (November 21, 2011 – February 17, 2012)
 Crime Klasik (December 2, 2011 – January 30, 2013)
 Chef Boy Logro: Kusina Master (January 2, 2012 – May 9, 2014)
 Hataw Balita Newsbreak (January 9, 2012 – July 15, 2016)
 Legacy (January 16, 2012 – June 1, 2012)
 Walang Hanggan (January 16, 2012 – October 26, 2012)
 5 Girls and a Dad (January 23, 2012 – August 24, 2012)
 iBilib (January 29, 2012 – present)
 Mundo Man ay Magunaw (January 30, 2012 – July 13, 2012)
 E-Boy (January 30, 2012 – April 13, 2012)
 Oka Tokat (February 4, 2012 – May 5, 2012)
 Spooky Valentine (February 4, 2012 – February 25, 2012)
 Showbiz Inside Report (February 4, 2012 – September 28, 2013)
 Sunday Screening (February 5, 2012 – June 2, 2019)
 Good Morning Club (February 6, 2012 – July 18, 2014)
 Broken Vow (February 6, 2012 – June 15, 2012)
 Alice Bungisngis and Her Wonder Walis (February 6, 2012 – June 8, 2012)
 Biritera (February 6, 2012 – May 18, 2012)
 The Biggest Game Show in the World Asia (February 12, 2012 – May 13, 2012)
 Toink (February 12, 2012 – May 13, 2012)
 The Good Daughter (February 13, 2012 – June 1, 2012)
 My Beloved (February 13, 2012 – June 8, 2012)
 Valiente (February 13, 2012 – June 29, 2012)
 Kapitan Awesome (February 19, 2012 – May 5, 2013)
 Luv U (February 19, 2012 – January 17, 2016)
 Nandito Ako (February 20, 2012 – March 23, 2012)
 Pilipinas News (February 20, 2012 – July 18, 2014)
 Sarah G. Live (February 26, 2012 – February 10, 2013)
 Felina: Prinsesa ng mga Pusa (February 27, 2012 – May 25, 2012)
 Isang Dakot Na Luha (February 27, 2012 – June 15, 2012)
 Updates (March 1, 2012 – present)
 Hiram na Puso (March 5, 2012 – July 6, 2012)
 Wako Wako (March 5, 2012 – May 25, 2012)
 Dahil sa Pag-ibig (March 12, 2012 – June 29, 2012)
 Sunday Funday (April 8, 2012 – June 10, 2012)
 Extreme Makeover: Home Edition Philippines (April 15, 2012 – June 17, 2012)
 Kung Ako'y Iiwan Mo (April 16, 2012 – November 16, 2012)
 Princess and I (April 16, 2012 – February 1, 2013)
 Cooking Kumares (April 23, 2012 – June 29, 2012)
 Tweets for My Sweet (May 6, 2012 – August 19, 2012)
 Aryana (May 7, 2012 – January 25, 2013)
 Pinoy Adventures (May 13, 2012 – September 29, 2012)
 Sharon: Kasama Mo, Kapatid (May 14, 2012 – January 4, 2013)
 Pare & Pare (May 20, 2012 – August 12, 2012)
 Luna Blanca (May 21, 2012 – October 26, 2012)
 Cooking with the Stars (May 28, 2012 – August 3, 2012)
 Kasalanan Bang Ibigin Ka? (June 4, 2012 – August 31, 2012)
 Makapiling Kang Muli (June 4, 2012 – September 7, 2012)
 Mars (June 11, 2012 – July 1, 2022)
 One True Love (June 11, 2012 – October 5, 2012)
 @ANCAlerts (June 11, 2012 – March 29, 2019)
 Game 'N Go (June 17, 2012 – February 3, 2013)
 Together Forever (June 17, 2012 – September 9, 2012)
 Faithfully (June 18, 2012 – October 5, 2012)
 CNN Philippines Network News (June 18, 2012 – March 26, 2017)
 The X Factor Philippines (June 23, 2012 – October 14, 2012)
 Mata ng Agila Weekend (June 30, 2012 – present)
 News @ 1 (July 2, 2012 – July 8, 2016)
 News @ 6 (July 2, 2012 – July 9, 2016)
 NewsLife (July 2, 2012 – July 8, 2016)
 Be Careful with My Heart (July 9, 2012 – November 28, 2014)
 Hindi Ka na Mag-iisa (July 9, 2012 – October 26, 2012)
 Kahit Puso'y Masugatan (July 9, 2012 – February 1, 2013)
 Angelito: Ang Bagong Yugto (July 16, 2012 – December 14, 2012)
 CNN Philippines Nightly News (July 16, 2012 – February 12, 2016)
 Third Eye (July 29, 2012 – October 21, 2012)
 Enchanted Garden (July 30, 2012 – January 4, 2013)
 Artista Academy (July 30, 2012 – October 27, 2012)
 Pilipinas News Weekend (August 4, 2012 - July 13, 2014)
 Ang Latest (August 4, 2012 – July 19, 2013)
 H.O.T. TV: Hindi Ordinaryong Tsismis (August 5, 2012 – April 28, 2013)
 Reaksyon (August 13, 2012 – November 3, 2017)
 UNTV News (August 27, 2012 – July 15, 2016)
 Sana Ay Ikaw Na Nga (September 3, 2012 – February 8, 2013)
 Panahon.TV (September 10, 2012 – present)
 Aso ni San Roque (September 10, 2012 – January 11, 2013)
 ETC HQ (September 16, 2012 – July 3, 2013)
 Hamon ng Kalikasan (September 20, 2012 – December 13, 2012)
 Newsday (October 1, 2012 – March 13, 2015)
 Daybreak (October 1, 2012 – March 13, 2015)
 Sarap, 'Di Ba? (October 6, 2012 – present)
 Magdalena (October 8, 2012 – January 18, 2013)
 Ina, Kapatid, Anak (October 8, 2012 – June 14, 2013)
 Coffee Prince (October 8, 2012 – November 23, 2012)
 Cielo de Angelina (October 22, 2012 – January 4, 2013)
 Taste Buddies (October 27, 2012 – June 26, 2022)
 Yesterday's Bride (October 29, 2012 – February 22, 2013)
 Temptation of Wife (October 29, 2012 – April 5, 2013)
 A Beautiful Affair (October 29, 2012 – January 18, 2013)
 The Amazing Race Philippines (October 29, 2012 – December 7, 2014)
 Paroa: Ang Kuwento ni Mariposa (November 5, 2012 – March 1, 2013)
 Nay-1-1 (November 12, 2012 – December 28, 2012)
 MasterChef Pinoy Edition (November 12, 2012 – February 9, 2013)
 Celebrity Bluff (November 17, 2012 – June 30, 2018)
 Watta Job (November 17, 2012 – February 16, 2013)
 Pahiram ng Sandali (November 26, 2012 – March 15, 2013)
 Legal Help Desk (November 26, 2012 – February 2, 2016)
 MedTalk (November 27, 2012 – present)
 News.PH (November 28, 2012 – September 2, 2022)
 News Café (November 30, 2012 – March 12, 2015)
 Pinoy True Stories (December 3, 2012 – May 4, 2020)
 Teen Gen (December 16, 2012 – June 30, 2013)
 Balitaan (January 7, 2013 – August 29, 2014)
 Jeepney Jackpot: Pera o Para! (January 7, 2013 – April 5, 2013)
 Kidlat (January 7, 2013 – May 3, 2013)
 Minute to Win It (January 14, 2013 – September 6, 2019)
 Indio (January 14, 2013 – May 31, 2013)
 The Alabang Housewives (January 14, 2013 – February 8, 2013)
 Kailangan Ko'y Ikaw (January 21, 2013 – April 19, 2013)
 May Isang Pangarap (January 21, 2013 – May 17, 2013)
 Forever (January 21, 2013 – April 19, 2013)
 Wowowillie (January 26, 2013 – October 12, 2013)
 Kahit Konting Pagtingin (January 28, 2013 – April 12, 2013)
 Cebuano News (January 28, 2013 – March 31, 2017)
 Biyahe ni Drew (February 1, 2013 – present)
 Para Sa 'Yo Ang Laban Na Ito (February 3, 2013 – April 20, 2013)
 Apoy Sa Dagat (February 4, 2013 – July 5, 2013)
 Wagas (February 9, 2013 – November 15, 2019)
 Kanta Pilipinas (February 9, 2013 – March 24, 2013)
 Never Say Goodbye (February 11, 2013 – May 10, 2013)
 Bukod Kang Pinagpala (February 11, 2013 – June 7, 2013)
 Unforgettable (February 25, 2013 – May 31, 2013)
 Martin Late at Night (March 1, 2013 – May 31, 2013)
 Vampire ang Daddy Ko (March 9, 2013 – June 12, 2016)
 Bayan Ko (March 10, 2013 – April 21, 2013)
 Little Champ (March 18, 2013 – May 24, 2013)
 Mundo Mo'y Akin (March 18, 2013 – September 6, 2013)
 Alisto (March 23, 2013 – February 9, 2021)
 Dugong Buhay (April 8, 2013 – September 27, 2013) 
 The Ryzza Mae Show (April 8, 2013 – September 18, 2015)
 Love & Lies (April 8, 2013 – June 7, 2013)
 Kakambal ni Eliana (April 15, 2013 – August 23, 2013)
 Home Sweet Home (April 22, 2013 – July 19, 2013)
 GMA Blockbusters (May 5, 2013 – present)
 Cassandra: Warrior Angel (May 6, 2013 – August 2, 2013)
 My Little Juan (May 20, 2013 – September 13, 2013)
 Annaliza (May 27, 2013 – March 21, 2014)
 Mga Basang Sisiw (June 3, 2013 – November 1, 2013)
 Anna Karenina (June 3, 2013 – September 20, 2013)
 Maghihintay Pa Rin (June 10, 2013 – September 27, 2013)
 My Husband's Lover (June 10, 2013 – October 18, 2013)
 One Day Isang Araw (June 15, 2013 – November 16, 2013)
 The Voice of the Philippines (June 15, 2013 – March 1, 2015)
 Sunday All Stars (June 16, 2013 – August 2, 2015)
 Huwag Ka Lang Mawawala (June 17, 2013 – August 23, 2013)
 With a Smile (June 17, 2013 – September 20, 2013)
 Undercover (July 1, 2013 – August 30, 2013)
 Misibis Bay (July 1, 2013 – August 30, 2013)
 Muling Buksan ang Puso (July 8, 2013 – October 4, 2013)
 Letters & Music (July 15, 2013 – January 1, 2021)
 Piskante ng Bayan (July 15, 2013 – October 15, 2021)
 Binoy Henyo (July 22, 2013 – September 20, 2013)
 Sa Ganang Mamamayan (July 29, 2013 – present)
 Opposing Views (August 2, 2013 – March 13, 2015) 
 Titser (August 11, 2013 – October 13, 2013)
 Anak Ko 'Yan! (August 26, 2013 – November 15, 2013)
 Agila Balita (August 26, 2013 – September 11, 2020)
 Pyra: Babaeng Apoy (August 26, 2013 – November 29, 2013)
 Got to Believe (August 26, 2013 – March 7, 2014)
 Bukas na Lang Kita Mamahalin (September 2, 2013 – November 15, 2013
 Akin Pa Rin ang Bukas (September 9, 2013 – December 27, 2013)
 Showbiz Police (September 14, 2013 – June 6, 2014)
 Tropa Mo Ko Unli (September 14, 2013 – July 4, 2015)
 What's Up Doods? (September 14, 2013 – December 21, 2013)
 The Mega and The Songwriter (September 15, 2013 – January 26, 2014)
 Bingit (September 21, 2013 – November 16, 2013)
 Dormitoryo (September 22, 2013 – December 22, 2013)
 Prinsesa ng Buhay Ko (September 23, 2013 – January 24, 2014)
 Kahit Nasaan Ka Man (September 23, 2013 – November 15, 2013)
 Love Hotline (September 23, 2013 – April 29, 2016)
 Galema: Anak ni Zuma (September 30, 2013 – March 28, 2014)
 Magkano Ba ang Pag-ibig? (September 30, 2013 – February 14, 2014)
 Maria Mercedes (October 7, 2013 – January 24, 2014)
 DZRH Network News (October 7, 2013 – present)
 Face the People (October 14, 2013 – November 21, 2014)
 Madam Chairman (October 14, 2013 – February 28, 2014)
 Let's Ask Pilipinas (October 14, 2013 – November 21, 2014)
 Genesis (October 14, 2013 – December 27, 2013)
 For Love or Money (October 17, 2013 – January 16, 2014)
 Positive (October 17, 2013 – January 9, 2014)
 History with Lourd (October 17, 2013 – April 26, 2016)
 Katipunan (October 19, 2013 – December 28, 2013)
 Juan Direction (October 19, 2013 – October 3, 2014)
 Honesto (October 28, 2013 – March 14, 2014)
 Villa Quintana (November 4, 2013 – June 6, 2014)
 Adarna (November 18, 2013 – March 7, 2014)
 Out of Control (November 23, 2013 – January 18, 2014)
 Picture! Picture! (November 23, 2013 – June 15, 2014)
 True Horror Stories (December 29, 2013 – February 11, 2017)
 Home Sweetie Home (January 5, 2014 – March 14, 2020)
 The Borrowed Wife (January 20, 2014 – May 23, 2014)
 News plus (January 20, 2014 – December 29, 2014)
 The Score (January 20, 2014 – July 22, 2020)
 Obsession (January 23, 2014 – April 10, 2014)
 The Legal Wife (January 27, 2014 – June 13, 2014)
 Paraiso Ko'y Ikaw (January 27, 2014 – March 28, 2014)
 Carmela: Ang Pinakamagandang Babae sa Mundong Ibabaw (January 27, 2014 – May 23, 2014)
 Rhodora X (January 27, 2014 – May 30, 2014)
 Movie Max 5 (February 1, 2014 – February 10, 2018)
 Aquino & Abunda Tonight (February 10, 2014 – September 25, 2015)
 Innamorata (February 17, 2014 – June 20, 2014)
 Confessions of a Torpe (March 3, 2014 – June 20, 2014)
 Ikaw Lamang (March 10, 2014 – October 24, 2014)
 Kambal Sirena (March 10, 2014 – June 27, 2014)
 Dyesebel (March 17, 2014 – August 15, 2014)
 Frontliners (March 19, 2014 – February 10, 2016)
 Asian Horror Stories (March 24, 2014 – March 31, 2017)
 Mirabella (March 24, 2014 – July 4, 2014)
 Agila Probinsiya (March 24, 2014 – November 26, 2021)
 Klima ng Pagbabago (March 24, 2014 – September 2, 2019) 
Moon of Desire (March 31, 2014 – August 15, 2014)
 My OFW Story (April 11, 2014 – February 12, 2016)
One of the Boys (May 3, 2014 – July 5, 2014)
 Basta Every Day Happy (May 12, 2014 – January 5, 2015)	
 The Voice Kids (May 24, 2014 – November 3, 2019)
 Niño (May 26, 2014 – September 12, 2014)
 GMA Tales of Horror (May 31, 2014 – May 3, 2015)
 Jasmine (June 1, 2014 – August 3, 2014)
 Ang Dalawang Mrs. Real (June 2, 2014 – September 19, 2014)
 The Half Sisters (June 9, 2014 – January 15, 2016)
 Sana Bukas pa ang Kahapon (June 16, 2014 – October 10, 2014)
 Marian (June 21, 2014 – December 6, 2014)
 Shop Japan (June 22, 2014 – March 28, 2018)
 Ismol Family (June 22, 2014 – November 6, 2016)
 Dading (June 23, 2014 – October 10, 2014)
 My BFF (June 30, 2014 – October 3, 2014)
 My Destiny (June 30, 2014 – October 17, 2014)
 Aksyon sa Tanghali (July 21, 2014 – March 13, 2020)
 Aksyon sa Umaga (July 21, 2014 – November 3, 2017)
 Aksyon Tonite (July 21, 2014 – March 1, 2019)
 Reel Action Sabado (August 2, 2014 – June 1, 2019)
 Kapampangan News (August 4, 2014 – March 31, 2017)
 Mga Kwento ni Marc Logan (August 9, 2014 – September 9, 2017)
 Quiet Please!: Bawal ang Maingay (August 10, 2014 – January 11, 2015)
 Sa Puso ni Dok (August 24, 2014 – September 28, 2014)
 I Do (August 30, 2014 – November 15, 2014)
 Trenderas (September 13, 2014 – December 27, 2014)
 Strawberry Lane (September 15, 2014 – January 2, 2015)
 Don't Lose the Money (September 22, 2014 – December 22, 2014)
 Hiram na Alaala (September 22, 2014 – January 9, 2015)
 Pinay Beauty Queen Academy (October 4, 2014 – September 20, 2015)
Bet ng Bayan (October 5, 2014 – December 28, 2014)
 Ang Lihim ni Annasandra (October 6, 2014 – February 6, 2015)
 Seasons of Love (October 6, 2014 – October 30, 2014)
 Elemento (October 10, 2014 – October 31, 2014)
 Two Wives (October 13, 2014 – March 13, 2015)
 Yagit (October 13, 2014 – July 24, 2015)
 Ilustrado (October 20, 2014 – November 14, 2014)
 Forevermore (October 27, 2014 – May 22, 2015)
 Bagito (November 17, 2014 – March 13, 2015)
 More Than Words (November 17, 2014 – March 6, 2015)
 Dream Dad (November 24, 2014 – April 17, 2015)
 Give Love on Christmas (December 1, 2014 – January 16, 2015)
 Once Upon a Kiss (January 5, 2015 – May 1, 2015)
 Second Chances (January 12, 2015 – May 8, 2015)
 Oh My G! (January 19, 2015 – July 24, 2015)
 FlordeLiza (January 19, 2015 – August 28, 2015)
 Nasaan Ka Nang Kailangan Kita (January 19, 2015 – October 16, 2015)
 Happy Wife, Happy Life (January 19, 2015 – October 2, 2015)
 Solved na Solved (January 19, 2015 – April 16, 2015)
 2½ Daddies (January 24, 2015 – July 4, 2015)
 Call Me Papa Jack (January 24, 2015 – April 19, 2015)
 Move It: Clash of the Streetdancers (January 25, 2015 – May 3, 2015)
 Mac and Chiz (January 25, 2015 – June 28, 2015)
 Extreme Series: Kaya Mo Ba 'To? (February 2, 2015 – June 20, 2015)
 Masayang Umaga Po! (February 2, 2015 – August 25, 2017)
 Why News (February 2, 2015 – present) 
 Kailan Ba Tama ang Mali? (February 9, 2015 – May 8, 2015)
 Pari 'Koy (March 9, 2015 – August 21, 2015)
 Your Face Sounds Familiar (March 14, 2015 – present) 
 Sabado Badoo (March 14, 2015 – July 25, 2015)
 Rising Stars Philippines (March 14, 2015 – May 23, 2015)
 Inday Bote (March 16, 2015 – May 29, 2015)
 Bridges of Love (March 16, 2015 – August 27, 2015)
 CNN Philippines Headline News (March 16, 2015 – February 12, 2016)
 CNN Philippines Newsroom (March 16, 2015 – present)
 Global Conversations (March 20, 2015 – August 26, 2016)
 InstaDad (April 5, 2015 – July 5, 2015)
 Showbiz Konek na Konek (April 6, 2015 – October 2, 2015)
 Karelasyon (April 11, 2015 – May 13, 2017)
 Kapamilya Mega Blockbusters (April 12, 2015 – November 4, 2018)
 Nathaniel (April 20, 2015 – September 25, 2015)
 Let the Love Begin (May 4, 2015 – August 7, 2015)
 Wowowin (May 10, 2015 – February 11, 2022)
 Healing Hearts (May 11, 2015 – September 11, 2015)
 The Rich Man's Daughter (May 11, 2015 – August 7, 2015)
 Baker King (May 18, 2015 – September 11, 2015)
 Pangako sa 'Yo (May 25, 2015 – February 12, 2016)
 My Mother's Secret (May 25, 2015 – August 7, 2015)
 Pasión de Amor (June 1, 2015 – February 26, 2016)
 Happy Truck ng Bayan (June 14, 2015 – February 7, 2016)
 Hi-5 Philippines (June 15, 2015 – April 29, 2016)
 Iskoolmates (June 23, 2015 – present) 
 Alamat (July 12, 2015 – June 19, 2016) 
 Kalyeserye (July 16, 2015 – December 17, 2016) 
 To The Top (July 25, 2015 – September 27, 2015) 
 Ningning (July 27, 2015 – January 15, 2016) 
 Buena Familia (July 28, 2015 – March 4, 2016) 
 Sunday PinaSaya (August 9, 2015 – December 29, 2019) 
 On the Wings of Love (August 10, 2015 – February 26, 2016) 
 Home Foodie (August 10, 2015 – September 6, 2019) 
 Beautiful Strangers (August 10, 2015 – November 27, 2015) 
 My Faithful Husband (August 10, 2015 – November 13, 2015) 
 Juan Tamad (August 23, 2015 – March 13, 2016) 
 Doble Kara (August 24, 2015 – February 10, 2017) 
 Marimar (August 24, 2015 – January 8, 2016) 
 All of Me (August 31, 2015 – January 29, 2016) 
 Real Talk (September 7, 2015 – December 29, 2017) 
 Destiny Rose (September 14, 2015 – March 11, 2016) 
 My Fair Lady (September 14, 2015 – December 11, 2015) 
 CelebriTV (September 19, 2015 – May 21, 2016)
 Princess in the Palace (September 21, 2015 – June 10, 2016)
 Celebrity Playtime (September 26, 2015 – April 3, 2016)
 Ang Probinsyano (September 28, 2015 – August 12, 2022)
 Tonight with Boy Abunda (September 28, 2015 – May 4, 2020)
 Top 5 (October 1, 2015 – May 27, 2018)
 Walang Iwanan (October 19, 2015 – December 4, 2015)
 Dangwa (October 26, 2015 – January 29, 2016)
 You're My Home (November 9, 2015 – March 23, 2016)
 Dance Kids (November 14, 2015 – February 7, 2016)
 Little Nanay (November 16, 2015 – March 23, 2016)
 Because of You (November 30, 2015 – May 13, 2016)
 And I Love You So (December 4, 2015 – March 11, 2016)
 Be My Lady (January 18, 2016 – November 25, 2016)
 Wish I May (January 18, 2016 – May 20, 2016)
 That's My Amboy (January 25, 2016 – April 29, 2016)
 Tubig at Langis (February 1, 2016 – September 2, 2016)
 Born to Be a Star (February 6, 2016 – May 8, 2021) 
 Tasya Fantasya (February 6, 2016 – April 30, 2016)
 I Love OPM (February 13, 2016 – April 23, 2016)
 Dear Uge (February 14, 2016 – present)
 Dolce Amore (February 15, 2016 – August 26, 2016)
 Bakit Manipis ang Ulap? (February 15, 2016 – April 22, 2016)
 New Day (February 15, 2016 – present)
 Midnight Horror Stories (February 20, 2016 – August 12, 2017)
 Lip Sync Battle Philippines (February 27, 2016 – June 1, 2018)
 We Will Survive (February 29, 2016 – July 15, 2016)
 The Story of Us (February 29, 2016 – June 17, 2016)
 Ang Panday (February 29, 2016 – June 2, 2016)
 Happy Truck HAPPinas (March 6, 2016 – May 1, 2016)
 Game ng Bayan (March 7, 2016 – April 15, 2016)
 Hanggang Makita Kang Muli (March 7, 2016 – July 15, 2016)
 The Millionaire's Wife (March 14, 2016 – June 24, 2016)
 Poor Señorita (March 28, 2016 – July 15, 2016)
 Balitaan (April 4, 2016 – present)
 Magandang Buhay (April 18, 2016 – present)
 My Super D (April 18, 2016 – July 15, 2016)
 Naku, Boss Ko! (April 25, 2016 – May 5, 2016)
 Yan ang Morning! (May 2, 2016 – August 12, 2016)
 Once Again (May 2, 2016 – July 22, 2016)
 We Love OPM (May 14, 2016 – July 17, 2016)
 Juan Happy Love Story (May 16, 2016 – September 2, 2016)
 Sine Squad (May 21, 2016 – September 20, 2019)
 Magkaibang Mundo (May 23, 2016 – September 16, 2016)
 Laff Camera Action (May 28, 2016 – August 27, 2016)
 A1 Ko Sa 'Yo (June 2, 2016 – November 24, 2016)
 Calle Siete (June 13, 2016 – October 21, 2016)
 Hay, Bahay! (June 19, 2016 – August 27, 2017)
 Team Yey! (June 19, 2016 – present)
 Born for You (June 20, 2016 – September 16, 2016)
 Conan, My Beautician (June 26, 2016 – September 18, 2016)
 Sa Piling ni Nanay (June 27, 2016 – January 27, 2017)
 Sinungaling Mong Puso (July 18, 2016 – October 28, 2016)
 Encantadia (July 18, 2016 – May 19, 2017)
 UNTV C-News (July 18, 2016 – present)
 UNTV Newsbreak (July 18, 2016 – present)
 Till I Met You (August 29, 2016 – January 20, 2017)
 Superstar Duets (September 3, 2016 – December 17, 2016)
 Hashtag Like (September 3, 2016 – February 11, 2017)
 Pasada Astig (September 3, 2016 – July 1, 2017)
 The Greatest Love (September 5, 2016 – April 21, 2017)
 Someone to Watch Over Me (September 5, 2016 – January 6, 2017)
 Pinoy Boyband Superstar (September 10, 2016 – December 11, 2016)
 Magpahanggang Wakas (September 19, 2016 – January 6, 2017)
 Oh, My Mama! (September 19, 2016 – December 2, 2016)
 Alyas Robin Hood (September 19, 2016 – November 24, 2017)
 Usapang Real Love (September 25, 2016 – December 18, 2016)
 The Source (September 26, 2016 – present)
 Payo Alternatibo (October 9, 2016 – February 24, 2019)
 Kilos Pronto (October 10, 2016 – April 30, 2018)
 Headline Pilipinas (October 10, 2016 – present)
 Tahor: Your Ultimate Gamefowl Show (October 22, 2016 – December 30, 2018)
Trops (October 24, 2016 – September 22, 2017)
 The Big Story (October 24, 2016 – present)
 Tulay: Your Bridge to Understanding, Peace and Prosperity (October 30, 2016 – present)
 Hahamakin ang Lahat (October 31, 2016 – February 17, 2017)
 Tsuperhero (November 13, 2016 – April 23, 2017)
 Langit Lupa (November 28, 2016 – April 28, 2017)
 Ika-6 na Utos (December 5, 2016 – March 17, 2018)
 A Love to Last (January 9, 2017 – September 22, 2017)
 Meant to Be (January 9, 2017 – June 23, 2017)
 People vs. the Stars (January 15, 2017 – April 16, 2017)
 My Dear Heart (January 23, 2017 – June 16, 2017)
 Pinulot Ka Lang sa Lupa (January 30, 2017 – April 12, 2017)
 Insider Exclusive Kapihan (February 1, 2017 – November 6, 2019)
 The Better Half (February 13, 2017 – September 8, 2017)
 Wildflower (February 13, 2017 – February 9, 2018)
 Case Solved (February 18, 2017 – March 25, 2017)
 Full House Tonight (February 18, 2017 – May 27, 2017)
 Legally Blind (February 20, 2017 – June 30, 2017)
 Destined to be Yours (February 27, 2017 – May 26, 2017)
 I Can Do That (March 11, 2017 – June 4, 2017)
 Pinas Sarap (March 13, 2017 – present)
 News Night (March 27, 2017 – present)
 The Voice Teens (April 16, 2017 – August 16, 2020)
 D' Originals (April 17, 2017 – July 7, 2017)
 Follow Your Heart (April 23, 2017 – July 16, 2017)
 Pusong Ligaw (April 24, 2017 – January 12, 2018)
 Daig Kayo ng Lola Ko (April 30, 2017 – present)
 Ikaw Lang ang Iibigin (May 1, 2017 – January 26, 2018)
 Daily Info (May 8, 2017 – July 31, 2020)
 Bagong Pilipinas (May 17, 2017 – July 31, 2020)
 Tadhana (May 20, 2017 – present)
 Lakbai (May 21, 2017 – July 9, 2017)
 Mulawin vs. Ravena (May 22, 2017 – September 15, 2017)
 My Love from the Star (May 29, 2017 – August 11, 2017)
 G Diaries (June 10, 2017 – March 27, 2022) 
 La Luna Sangre (June 19, 2017 – March 2, 2018)
 I Heart Davao (June 26, 2017 – August 18, 2017)
 An Evening with Raoul (July 1, 2017 – August 19, 2017)
 Impostora (July 3, 2017 – February 9, 2018)
 Haplos (July 10, 2017 – February 23, 2018)
 Sentro Balita (July 10, 2017 – present)
 Ulat Bayan (July 10, 2017 – present)
 PTV News Headlines (July 10, 2017 – July 31, 2020)
 Road Trip (July 23, 2017 – January 14, 2018)
 Little Big Shots (August 12, 2017 – December 31, 2017)
 Aksyon Alerts (August 14, 2017 – March 15, 2020)
 G.R.I.N.D. Get Ready It's a New Day (August 19, 2017 – October 21, 2017)
 My Korean Jagiya (August 21, 2017 – January 12, 2018)
 All-Star Videoke (September 3, 2017 – March 25, 2018)
 Japan Japan 47 (September 3, 2017 – November 26, 2017)
 Dok Ricky, Pedia (September 9, 2017 – present)
 The Promise of Forever (September 11, 2017 – November 24, 2017)
 I Can See Your Voice (September 16, 2017 – February 7, 2021)
 Super Ma'am (September 18, 2017 – January 26, 2018)
 Bossing & Ai (September 24, 2017 – February 4, 2018)
 The Good Son (September 25, 2017 – April 13, 2018)
 The Lolas' Beautiful Show (September 25, 2017 – February 2, 2018)
 PNA Newsroom (October 16, 2017 – present)
 Stories for the Soul (October 29, 2017 – June 30, 2019)
 Hanggang Saan (November 27, 2017 – April 27, 2018)
 Kambal, Karibal (November 27, 2017 – August 3, 2018)
 SportsCenter Philippines (December 17, 2017 – July 21, 2020)
 Crime Desk (January 13, 2018 – June 1, 2019)
 Asintado (January 15, 2018 – October 5, 2018)
 The One That Got Away (January 15, 2018 – May 18, 2018)
 Sirkus (January 21, 2018 – April 15, 2018)
 Sana Dalawa ang Puso (January 29, 2018 – September 14, 2018)
 Sherlock Jr. (January 29, 2018 – April 27, 2018)
 The Blood Sisters (February 12, 2018 – August 17, 2018)
 The Stepdaughters (February 12, 2018 – October 19, 2018)
 Hindi Ko Kayang Iwan Ka (February 26, 2018 – August 31, 2018)
 Bagani (March 5, 2018 – August 17, 2018)
 Ang Forever Ko'y Ikaw (March 12, 2018 – May 4, 2018)
 Contessa (March 19, 2018 – September 8, 2018)
 The Atom Araullo Specials (April 1, 2018 – present)
 Panalo Ka 'Nay! (April 8, 2018 – May 27, 2018)
 Since I Found You (April 16, 2018 – August 10, 2018)
 Amo (April 21, 2018 – July 14, 2018)
 My Guitar Princess (May 7, 2018 – July 13, 2018)
 Inday Will Always Love You (May 21, 2018 – October 5, 2018)
 One News Now (May 28, 2018 – present)
 One News Live (May 28, 2018 – April 28, 2019)
 Amazing Earth (June 17, 2018 – present)
 The Clash (July 7, 2018 – present)
 Kapag Nahati ang Puso (July 16, 2018 – November 2, 2018)
 Aja Aja Tayo! (July 21, 2018 – June 2, 2019)
 Pareng Partners (July 28, 2018 – March 23, 2019)
 Victor Magtanggol (July 30, 2018 – November 16, 2018)
 Onanay (August 6, 2018 – March 15, 2019)
 Halik (August 13, 2018 – April 26, 2019)
 Star Hunt: The Grand Audition Show (August 20, 2018 – November 9, 2018)
 Ngayon at Kailanman (August 20, 2018 – January 18, 2019)
 The Kids' Choice (September 1, 2018 – November 4, 2018)
 My Special Tatay (September 3, 2018 – March 29, 2019)
 Uniporme (September 8, 2018 – December 1, 2018)
 Ika-5 Utos (September 10, 2018 – February 8, 2019)
 Playhouse (September 17, 2018 – March 22, 2019)
 Eagle News International Filipino Edition (October 2, 2018 – February 12, 2021)
 Kadenang Ginto (October 8, 2018 – February 7, 2020)
 Pamilya Roses (October 8, 2018 – December 14, 2018)
 Daddy's Gurl (October 13, 2018 – present)
 Studio 7 (October 14, 2018 – December 7, 2019)
 Asawa Ko, Karibal Ko (October 22, 2018 – March 2, 2019)
 Usapang SSS (November 1, 2018 – March 2, 2019)
 Titas of the Metro (November 3, 2018 – December 8, 2018)
 Toppstar TV (November 10, 2018 – December 8, 2019)
 F Talk (November 17, 2018 – February 24, 2019)
 Cain at Abel (November 19, 2018 – February 15, 2019)
 ASK TV: Artihan, Sayawan at Kantahan (December 1, 2018 – March 21, 2020)
 Time Out (January 12, 2019 – January 26, 2019)
 World of Dance Philippines (January 12, 2019 – April 7, 2019)
 Sine Squad Sunday (January 13, 2019 – September 15, 2019)
 Sine Squad Saturday (January 19, 2019 – September 21, 2019)
 The General's Daughter (January 21, 2019 – October 4, 2019)
 The Boobay and Tekla Show (January 27, 2019 – present)
 Saludo: Pagpupugay sa Bayaning Pilipino (January 27, 2019 – March 24, 2019)
 TODA One I Love (February 4, 2019 – April 17, 2019)
 Inagaw na Bituin (February 11, 2019 – May 17, 2019)
 Mula sa Edukador (February 17, 2019 – May 5, 2019)
 Kara Mia (February 18, 2019 – June 28, 2019)
 One Balita Pilipinas (February 18, 2019 – present)
 Agila Pilipinas (February 18, 2019 – August 9, 2021)
 Politics as Usual (February 19, 2019 – May 14, 2020)
 Hiram na Anak (February 25, 2019 – May 3, 2019)
 Tutok 13 (February 25, 2019 – present)
 Talents Academy (March 2, 2019 – March 21, 2020)
 Dragon Lady (March 4, 2019 – July 20, 2019)
 Bukas May Kahapon (March 4, 2019 – April 26, 2019)
 Sahaya (March 18, 2019 – September 6, 2019)
 OOTD: Opisyal of the Day (March 19, 2019 – May 9, 2019)
 Tilaok TV (March 22, 2019 – March 21, 2020)
 Nang Ngumiti ang Langit (March 25, 2019 – October 18, 2019)
 Bihag (April 1, 2019 – August 16, 2019)
 Hiwaga ng Kambat (April 21, 2019 – August 25, 2019)
 Idol Philippines (April 21, 2019 – July 28, 2019)
 Love You Two (April 22, 2019 – September 13, 2019)
 Kuha Mo! (April 27, 2019 – July 25, 2020)
 Sino ang Maysala?: Mea Culpa (April 29, 2019 – August 9, 2019)
 Alex & Amie (May 20, 2019 – May 31, 2019)
 Dahil sa Pag-ibig (May 20, 2019 – October 4, 2019)
 Glow Up (June 9, 2019 – March 15, 2020)
 The Better Woman (July 1, 2019 – September 27, 2019)
 Artista Teen Quest (July 12, 2019 – December 28, 2019)
 Hanggang sa Dulo ng Buhay Ko (July 22, 2019 – October 19, 2019)
 World-Class Kababayan (July 27, 2019 – October 19, 2019)
 Regional TV Weekend News (July 27, 2019 – July 24, 2021)
 iWant Originals (August 11, 2019 – April 3, 2020)
 The Killer Bride (August 12, 2019 – January 17, 2020)
 Unlad Pilipinas (August 12, 2019 – present)
 Prima Donnas (August 19, 2019 – April 30, 2022)
 Arnelli in da Haus (August 22, 2019 – January 29, 2020)
 Parasite Island (September 8, 2019 – December 1, 2019)
 Pamilya Ko (September 9, 2019 – March 13, 2020)
 Beautiful Justice (September 9, 2019 – January 24, 2020)
 The Gift (September 16, 2019 – February 7, 2020)
 Primetime Mega-Hits (September 23, 2019 – July 19, 2020)
 Sine Spectacular (September 24, 2019 – July 19, 2020)
 Saturday Night Specials (September 28, 2019 – February 29, 2020)
 Off-Court Battle (September 29, 2019 – October 13, 2019)
 Sunday Film Festival (September 29, 2019 – March 1, 2020)
 Kapamilya Super Blockbusters (September 29, 2019 – March 15, 2020)
 Sandugo (September 30, 2019 – March 20, 2020)
 One of the Baes (September 30, 2019 – January 31, 2020)
 Lutong-Luto with CJ Hirro (October 5, 2019 – January 4, 2020)
 Starla (October 7, 2019 – January 10, 2020)
 Madrasta (October 7, 2019 – February 21, 2020)
 Eucharistia: Pananalangin at Pag-aaral (October 12, 2019 – January 18, 2020)
 Magkaagaw (October 21, 2019 – March 31, 2021)
 Your Moment (November 9, 2019 – February 2, 2020)
 Ani at Kita (November 16, 2019 – December 29, 2019)
 The Haunted (December 8, 2019 – February 9, 2020)

2020's
 All-Out Sundays (January 5, 2020 – present)
 Make It with You (January 13, 2020 – March 13, 2020)
 A Soldier's Heart (January 20, 2020 – September 25, 2020)
 Anak ni Waray vs. Anak ni Biday (January 27, 2020 – March 12, 2021)
 Love of My Life (February 3, 2020 – March 19, 2021)
 Love Thy Woman (February 10, 2020 – September 11, 2020)
 Descendants of the Sun (February 10, 2020 – December 25, 2020)
 Centerstage (February 16, 2020 – June 6, 2021)
 Ilaban Natin Yan! (February 22, 2020 – April 4, 2020)
 24/7 (February 23, 2020 – March 15, 2020)
 Bilangin ang Bituin sa Langit (February 24, 2020 – March 26, 2021)
 Team Fitfil (April 1, 2020 – present)
 Serbisyong Bayanihan (April 6, 2020 – present)
 24 Oras News Alert (April 18, 2020 – present)
 Matters of Fact (April 27, 2020 – May 21, 2021)
 Hataw Balita Pilipinas (May 25, 2020 – present)
 Idol in Action (June 8, 2020 – October 1, 2021)
 Happy Naman D'yan (June 8, 2020 – July 17, 2020)
 Kapamilya Action Sabado (June 13, 2020 – present)
 Paano Kita Mapasasalamatan? (June 13, 2020 – June 26, 2021)
 Super Kapamilya Blockbusters (June 13, 2020 – June 12, 2021)
 Iba 'Yan (June 14, 2020 – June 27, 2021)
 Kapamilya Gold Hits (June 15, 2020 – present)
 UNTV News Worldwide (July 13, 2020 – present)
 TVflix (July 21, 2020 – March 2, 2021)
 Action Spectacular (July 22, 2020 – April 7, 2021)
 Sine Asya (July 23, 2020 – March 4, 2021)
 Fan Faves (July 24, 2020 – April 9, 2021)
 PTV Balita Ngayon (July 26, 2020 – present)
 FYI (August 2, 2020 – present)
 Bawal Na Game Show (August 15, 2020 – March 30, 2021)
 Fill in the Bank (August 15, 2020 – March 31, 2021)
 Usapang Real Life (August 15, 2020 – January 9, 2021)
 Fit for Life (August 16, 2020 – November 1, 2020)
 Chika, Besh! (August 17, 2020 – January 8, 2021)
 Ang sa Iyo ay Akin (August 17, 2020 – March 19, 2021)
 Rise and Shine Pilipinas (September 7, 2020 – present)
 PTV News Tonight (September 7, 2020 – present)
 Happy Time (September 14, 2020 – October 15, 2021)
 Makulay ang Buhay (September 15, 2020 – November 16, 2021)
 Saturday Cinema Hits (September 19, 2020 – September 25, 2021)
 Siesta Fiesta Movies (September 21, 2020 – present)
 Kesayasaya (September 27, 2020 – 2021)
 Sine Date Weekends (September 27, 2020 – September 4, 2022)
 The Big Picture (September 27, 2020 – January 29, 2023)
 I Can See You (September 28, 2020 – April 23, 2021)
 Walang Hanggang Paalam (September 28, 2020 – April 16, 2021)
 Frontline Pilipinas (October 5, 2020 – present)
 News5 Alerts (October 5, 2020 – present)
 Zinema sa Umaga (October 10, 2020 – present)
 Primetime Zinema (October 12, 2020 – December 31, 2021)
 Zinema Presents (October 12, 2020 – October 23, 2020)
 Zine Aksyon (October 17, 2020 – present)
 Zine Love (October 17, 2020 – present)
 Pinoy Movie Break (October 17, 2020 – November 22, 2020)
 Sunday Noontime Live! (October 18, 2020 – January 17, 2021)
 Sunday 'Kada (October 18, 2020 – present)
 Lunch Out Loud (October 19, 2020 – present)
 Oh My Dad! (October 24, 2020 – April 24, 2021)
 Masked Singer Pilipinas (October 24, 2020 – January 16, 2021)
 Sunday Zine Hits (October 25, 2020 – November 29, 2020)
 Holiday Gifts (October 25, 2020 – January 10, 2021)
 Bagong Umaga (October 26, 2020 – April 30, 2021)
 A2Z News Alert (November 16, 2020 – November 12, 2021)
 Ate ng Ate Ko (November 23, 2020 – February 15, 2021)
 Paano ang Pangako? (November 23, 2020 – March 31, 2021)
 Stay-In Love (November 24, 2020 – February 16, 2021)
 Bella Bandida (November 25, 2020 – December 30, 2020)
 Carpool (November 26, 2020 – December 31, 2020)
 Afternoon Movie Break (November 28, 2020 – present)
 Eat's Singing Time (January 4, 2021 – May 28, 2021)
 Sleepless: The Series (January 6, 2021 – February 17, 2021)
 Eat Well, Live Well, Stay Well (January 8, 2021 – April 1, 2022)
 Letters & Music Weekend Edition (January 9, 2021 – present)
 Wanted: Ang Serye (January 16, 2021 – May 1, 2021)
 The Lost Recipe (January 18, 2021 – March 31, 2021)
 Red Envelope (January 22, 2021 – February 19, 2021)
 John en Ellen (January 24, 2021 – August 1, 2021)
 My Fantastic Pag-ibig (January 30, 2021 – October 30, 2021)
 Catch Me Out Philippines (February 6, 2021 – April 24, 2021)
 Game of the Gens (February 14, 2021 – June 28, 2021)
 Balitalakayan (February 15, 2021 – January 20, 2022)
 Owe My Love (February 15, 2021 – June 4, 2021)
 One Balita Ngayon (February 15, 2021 – present)
 On Record (February 16, 2021 – January 11, 2022)
 Farm to Table (February 21, 2021 – present)
 Babawiin Ko ang Lahat (February 22, 2021 – May 21, 2021)
 Primetime Sine Festival (February 27, 2021 – March 5, 2021)
 Ang Inyong Kawal (February 27, 2021 – present)
 Ikaw ay Akin (March 6, 2021 – May 29, 2021)
 Gen Z (March 7, 2021 – May 30, 2021)
 The Wall Philippines (March 13, 2021 – present)
 First Yaya (March 15, 2021 – July 2, 2021)
 Stories of Hope (March 15, 2021 – January 10, 2022)
 1000 Heartbeats: Pintig Pinoy (March 20, 2021 – June 12, 2021)
 Aja! Aja! Tayo sa Jeju (March 20, 2021 – June 12, 2021)
 Huwag Kang Mangamba (March 22, 2021 – November 12, 2021)
 Sing Galing! (April 5, 2021 – present)
 Niña Niño (April 5, 2021 – May 19, 2022)
 Cine Cinco (April 12, 2021 – present)
 Sine Todo (April 17, 2021 – present)
 Sine Spotlight (April 18, 2021 – present)
 Init sa Magdamag (April 19, 2021 – September 10, 2021)
 Hollywood Movies (April 25, 2021 – November 21, 2021)
 Heartful Café (April 26, 2021 – June 18, 2021)
 G! Flicks (April 26, 2021 – present)
 The Game (April 26, 2021 – present)
 Agimat ng Agila (May 1, 2021 – July 24, 2021)
 Oras ng Kings (May 8, 2021 – July 31, 2021)
 Frontline sa Umaga (May 10, 2021 – present)
 Sari-Sari Presents: Viva Cinema (May 15, 2021 – present)
 Rise Up Stronger (May 23, 2021 – August 8, 2021)
 After The Fact (May 24, 2021 – March 30, 2022)
 Everybody, Sing! (June 5, 2021 – present)
 Rolling In It Philippines (June 5, 2021 – present)
 The Game Weekend (June 5, 2021 – present)
 Asian Cinemix (June 7, 2021 – present)
 Lingap Stories (June 12, 2021 – present)
 POPinoy (June 13, 2021 – November 7, 2021)
 Puto (June 19, 2021 – September 11, 2021)
 Ang Dalawang Ikaw (June 21, 2021 – September 10, 2021)
 Tina Monzon-Palma Reports (June 26, 2021 – present)
 La Vida Lena (June 28, 2021 – February 4, 2022)
 POPinoy PopDates (July 4, 2021 – November 14, 2021)
 Flex (July 4, 2021 – August 21, 2021)
 The World Between Us (July 5, 2021 – January 7, 2022)
 Balitang A2Z (July 26, 2021 – present)
 Legal Wives (July 26, 2021 – November 12, 2021)
 Regional TV News (July 26, 2021 – present)
 Regal Treasures (July 30, 2021 – present)
 Aksyon Time (July 31, 2021 – January 29, 2022)
 Ito Ang Tahanan (August 10, 2021  – present)
 Let's Get Ready To TV-Radyo (August 10, 2021 – August 5, 2022)
 Kada Umaga (August 30, 2021 – present)
 Regal Studio Presents (September 11, 2021 – present)
 Marry Me, Marry You (September 13, 2021 – January 21, 2022)
 Stories from the Heart (September 13, 2021 – January 7, 2022)
 Di Na Muli (September 18, 2021 – December 18, 2021)
 Frontline Tonight (September 27, 2021 – present)
 (A.S.P.N.) Ano sa Palagay Niyo (October 18, 2021 – present)
 Dapat Alam Mo! (October 18, 2021 – present)
 Funniest Snackable Videos (November 1, 2021 – April 1, 2022)
 K-Drama Special Stories (November 6, 2021 – September 3, 2022)
 Cucina ni Nadia (November 13, 2021 – June 4, 2022)
 I Left My Heart in Sorsogon (November 15, 2021 – February 11, 2022)
 Ulat A2Z (November 15, 2021 – present)
 Viral Scandal (November 15, 2021 – May 13, 2022)
 Responde: Mata ng Mamamayan (November 20, 2021 – present)
 Tara! Ating Pasyalan (November 20, 2021 – present)
 Tara Game, Agad Agad! (November 21, 2021 – present)
 Movie Holidates (December 20, 2021 – December 30, 2021)
 Afternoon Zinema (January 3, 2022 – present)
 Mano Po Legacy: The Family Fortune (January 3, 2022 – February 25, 2022)
 Little Princess (January 10, 2022 – April 22, 2022)
 The Broken Marriage Vow (January 24, 2022 – June 24, 2022)
 Sunday Kapamilya Blockbusters (February 6, 2022 – April 3, 2022)
 Proyekto Pilipino (February 6, 2022 – present)
 First Lady (February 14, 2022 – July 1, 2022)
 The Best Ka! (February 20, 2022 – June 5, 2022)
 Bet to Serve (February 27, 2022 – April 28, 2022)
 Widows' Web (February 28, 2022 – April 29, 2022)
 Artikulo 247 (March 7, 2022 – June 3, 2022)
 Mano Po Legacy: Her Big Boss (March 14, 2022 – June 2, 2022)
 The Chatroom (March 17, 2022 – May 5, 2022)
 BalitaOnenan! (March 21, 2022 – present)
 Julius and Tintin: Para sa Pamilyang Pilipino (March 21, 2022 – present)
 Ride Tribe (March 27, 2022 – present)
 Know Your Candidates (April 4, 2022 – May 6, 2022)
 Mata ng Agila International (April 4, 2022 – present)
 KBYN: Kaagapay ng Bayan (April 10, 2022 – present)
 AgriKids (April 17, 2022 – present)
 Lakwatsika (April 18, 2022 – July 15, 2022)
 Raya Sirena (April 24, 2022 – June 5, 2022)
 Raising Mamay (April 25, 2022 – July 29, 2022)
 Apoy sa Langit (May 2, 2022 – September 3, 2022)
 False Positive (May 2, 2022 – May 27, 2022)
 One Balita Weekend (May 7, 2022 – present)
 2 Good 2 Be True (May 16, 2022 – November 11, 2022)
 Dear God (May 23, 2022 – July 14, 2022)
 Love in 40 Days (May 30, 2022 – October 28, 2022)
 Bolera (May 30, 2022 – August 26, 2022)
 The Fake Life (June 6, 2022 – September 23, 2022)
 Flower of Evil (June 25, 2022 – October 9, 2022)
 TOLS (June 25, 2022 – September 17, 2022)
 A Family Affair (June 27, 2022 – November 4, 2022)
 Sine Throwback (July 3, 2022 – present)
 Lolong (July 4, 2022 – September 30, 2022)
 Late Night Delight (July 11, 2022 – present)
 Pinoy Mega Hits (July 11, 2022 – present)
 Sine Siesta (July 12, 2022 – present)
 Suntok sa Buwan (July 18, 2022 – December 8, 2022)
 Return to Paradise (August 1, 2022 – November 4, 2022)
 Darna (August 15, 2022 – February 10, 2023)
 What We Could Be (August 29, 2022 – October 27, 2022)
 Viva Movie Classics (September 1, 2022 – present)
 Running Man Philippines (September 3, 2022 – December 18, 2022)
 Abot-Kamay na Pangarap (September 5, 2022 – present)
 All Flix (September 17, 2022 – present)
 ONE Warrior Series: Philippines (September 18, 2022 – November 27, 2022)
 Mang Lalakbay (September 25, 2022 – present)
 Nakarehas na Puso (September 26, 2022 – January 13, 2023)
 Start-Up PH (September 26, 2022 – December 23, 2022)
 Maria Clara at Ibarra (October 3, 2022 – February 24, 2023)
 Mano Po Legacy: The Flower Sisters (October 31, 2022 – January 13, 2023)
 Unica Hija (November 7, 2022 – March 3, 2023)
 The Iron Heart (November 14, 2022 – present)
 Underage (January 16, 2023 – present)
 Luv Is (January 16, 2023 – present)
 Fast Talk with Boy Abunda (January 23, 2023 – present)
 Dirty Linen (January 23, 2023 – present)
 Batang Quiapo (February 13, 2023 – present)
 Mga Lihim ni Urduja (February 27, 2023 – present)
 AraBella (March 6, 2023 – present)

See also
 :Category:Philippine television series debuts by decade

Television in the Philippines by year
Philippine television-related lists